

72001–72100 

|-bgcolor=#fefefe
| 72001 ||  || — || November 18, 2000 || Anderson Mesa || LONEOS || — || align=right | 3.2 km || 
|-id=002 bgcolor=#fefefe
| 72002 ||  || — || November 19, 2000 || Anderson Mesa || LONEOS || V || align=right | 1.8 km || 
|-id=003 bgcolor=#fefefe
| 72003 ||  || — || December 1, 2000 || Socorro || LINEAR || — || align=right | 1.8 km || 
|-id=004 bgcolor=#E9E9E9
| 72004 ||  || — || December 1, 2000 || Socorro || LINEAR || MIT || align=right | 6.1 km || 
|-id=005 bgcolor=#fefefe
| 72005 ||  || — || December 1, 2000 || Socorro || LINEAR || V || align=right | 1.8 km || 
|-id=006 bgcolor=#fefefe
| 72006 ||  || — || December 1, 2000 || Socorro || LINEAR || FLO || align=right | 1.5 km || 
|-id=007 bgcolor=#fefefe
| 72007 ||  || — || December 1, 2000 || Socorro || LINEAR || — || align=right | 1.8 km || 
|-id=008 bgcolor=#fefefe
| 72008 ||  || — || December 1, 2000 || Socorro || LINEAR || — || align=right | 6.8 km || 
|-id=009 bgcolor=#fefefe
| 72009 ||  || — || December 1, 2000 || Socorro || LINEAR || FLO || align=right | 1.5 km || 
|-id=010 bgcolor=#fefefe
| 72010 ||  || — || December 1, 2000 || Socorro || LINEAR || — || align=right | 1.9 km || 
|-id=011 bgcolor=#fefefe
| 72011 ||  || — || December 1, 2000 || Socorro || LINEAR || LCI || align=right | 2.8 km || 
|-id=012 bgcolor=#fefefe
| 72012 Terute ||  ||  || December 4, 2000 || Bisei SG Center || BATTeRS || — || align=right | 2.3 km || 
|-id=013 bgcolor=#E9E9E9
| 72013 ||  || — || December 1, 2000 || Socorro || LINEAR || — || align=right | 4.4 km || 
|-id=014 bgcolor=#fefefe
| 72014 ||  || — || December 4, 2000 || Socorro || LINEAR || V || align=right | 1.3 km || 
|-id=015 bgcolor=#E9E9E9
| 72015 ||  || — || December 4, 2000 || Socorro || LINEAR || — || align=right | 7.1 km || 
|-id=016 bgcolor=#E9E9E9
| 72016 ||  || — || December 4, 2000 || Socorro || LINEAR || EUN || align=right | 3.1 km || 
|-id=017 bgcolor=#fefefe
| 72017 ||  || — || December 4, 2000 || Socorro || LINEAR || — || align=right | 2.8 km || 
|-id=018 bgcolor=#E9E9E9
| 72018 ||  || — || December 4, 2000 || Socorro || LINEAR || EUN || align=right | 3.7 km || 
|-id=019 bgcolor=#E9E9E9
| 72019 ||  || — || December 4, 2000 || Socorro || LINEAR || 526 || align=right | 7.1 km || 
|-id=020 bgcolor=#fefefe
| 72020 ||  || — || December 5, 2000 || Socorro || LINEAR || PHO || align=right | 2.3 km || 
|-id=021 bgcolor=#fefefe
| 72021 Yisunji ||  ||  || December 4, 2000 || Bohyunsan || Y.-B. Jeon, B.-C. Lee || — || align=right | 1.9 km || 
|-id=022 bgcolor=#fefefe
| 72022 ||  || — || December 4, 2000 || Socorro || LINEAR || V || align=right | 1.9 km || 
|-id=023 bgcolor=#fefefe
| 72023 ||  || — || December 4, 2000 || Socorro || LINEAR || — || align=right | 1.9 km || 
|-id=024 bgcolor=#fefefe
| 72024 ||  || — || December 4, 2000 || Socorro || LINEAR || FLO || align=right | 1.6 km || 
|-id=025 bgcolor=#fefefe
| 72025 ||  || — || December 4, 2000 || Socorro || LINEAR || FLO || align=right | 1.2 km || 
|-id=026 bgcolor=#fefefe
| 72026 ||  || — || December 4, 2000 || Socorro || LINEAR || — || align=right | 2.1 km || 
|-id=027 bgcolor=#fefefe
| 72027 ||  || — || December 4, 2000 || Socorro || LINEAR || — || align=right | 2.0 km || 
|-id=028 bgcolor=#fefefe
| 72028 ||  || — || December 4, 2000 || Socorro || LINEAR || FLO || align=right | 1.7 km || 
|-id=029 bgcolor=#fefefe
| 72029 ||  || — || December 4, 2000 || Socorro || LINEAR || — || align=right | 1.9 km || 
|-id=030 bgcolor=#fefefe
| 72030 ||  || — || December 4, 2000 || Socorro || LINEAR || — || align=right | 5.3 km || 
|-id=031 bgcolor=#E9E9E9
| 72031 ||  || — || December 4, 2000 || Socorro || LINEAR || EUN || align=right | 3.2 km || 
|-id=032 bgcolor=#E9E9E9
| 72032 ||  || — || December 4, 2000 || Socorro || LINEAR || — || align=right | 8.2 km || 
|-id=033 bgcolor=#E9E9E9
| 72033 ||  || — || December 4, 2000 || Socorro || LINEAR || MAR || align=right | 3.0 km || 
|-id=034 bgcolor=#fefefe
| 72034 ||  || — || December 5, 2000 || Socorro || LINEAR || PHO || align=right | 3.3 km || 
|-id=035 bgcolor=#fefefe
| 72035 ||  || — || December 6, 2000 || Bisei SG Center || BATTeRS || — || align=right | 2.6 km || 
|-id=036 bgcolor=#fefefe
| 72036 ||  || — || December 9, 2000 || Fountain Hills || C. W. Juels || PHOmoon || align=right | 2.7 km || 
|-id=037 bgcolor=#fefefe
| 72037 Castelldefels ||  ||  || December 10, 2000 || Begues || J. Manteca || — || align=right | 2.2 km || 
|-id=038 bgcolor=#fefefe
| 72038 ||  || — || December 4, 2000 || Socorro || LINEAR || — || align=right | 3.2 km || 
|-id=039 bgcolor=#fefefe
| 72039 ||  || — || December 4, 2000 || Socorro || LINEAR || V || align=right | 1.8 km || 
|-id=040 bgcolor=#E9E9E9
| 72040 ||  || — || December 4, 2000 || Socorro || LINEAR || — || align=right | 3.3 km || 
|-id=041 bgcolor=#fefefe
| 72041 ||  || — || December 15, 2000 || Uccle || T. Pauwels || — || align=right | 2.1 km || 
|-id=042 bgcolor=#fefefe
| 72042 Dequeiroz ||  ||  || December 17, 2000 || Gnosca || S. Sposetti || NYS || align=right | 2.1 km || 
|-id=043 bgcolor=#fefefe
| 72043 ||  || — || December 19, 2000 || Socorro || LINEAR || — || align=right | 2.5 km || 
|-id=044 bgcolor=#fefefe
| 72044 ||  || — || December 20, 2000 || Socorro || LINEAR || — || align=right | 1.4 km || 
|-id=045 bgcolor=#fefefe
| 72045 ||  || — || December 20, 2000 || Socorro || LINEAR || — || align=right | 3.1 km || 
|-id=046 bgcolor=#fefefe
| 72046 ||  || — || December 20, 2000 || Socorro || LINEAR || — || align=right | 2.4 km || 
|-id=047 bgcolor=#fefefe
| 72047 ||  || — || December 20, 2000 || Socorro || LINEAR || ERI || align=right | 4.4 km || 
|-id=048 bgcolor=#fefefe
| 72048 ||  || — || December 20, 2000 || Socorro || LINEAR || V || align=right | 1.7 km || 
|-id=049 bgcolor=#fefefe
| 72049 ||  || — || December 20, 2000 || Socorro || LINEAR || — || align=right | 1.9 km || 
|-id=050 bgcolor=#fefefe
| 72050 ||  || — || December 20, 2000 || Socorro || LINEAR || V || align=right | 1.7 km || 
|-id=051 bgcolor=#E9E9E9
| 72051 ||  || — || December 21, 2000 || Socorro || LINEAR || — || align=right | 5.3 km || 
|-id=052 bgcolor=#fefefe
| 72052 ||  || — || December 21, 2000 || Socorro || LINEAR || — || align=right | 2.4 km || 
|-id=053 bgcolor=#fefefe
| 72053 ||  || — || December 21, 2000 || Socorro || LINEAR || — || align=right | 2.1 km || 
|-id=054 bgcolor=#fefefe
| 72054 ||  || — || December 21, 2000 || Farpoint || G. Hug || V || align=right | 1.6 km || 
|-id=055 bgcolor=#fefefe
| 72055 ||  || — || December 22, 2000 || Višnjan Observatory || K. Korlević || — || align=right | 4.0 km || 
|-id=056 bgcolor=#fefefe
| 72056 ||  || — || December 19, 2000 || Kitt Peak || Spacewatch || — || align=right | 1.9 km || 
|-id=057 bgcolor=#fefefe
| 72057 ||  || — || December 23, 2000 || Starkenburg Observatory || Starkenburg Obs. || — || align=right | 2.8 km || 
|-id=058 bgcolor=#fefefe
| 72058 ||  || — || December 21, 2000 || Uccle || T. Pauwels || NYS || align=right | 4.0 km || 
|-id=059 bgcolor=#fefefe
| 72059 Heojun ||  ||  || December 21, 2000 || Bohyunsan || Y.-B. Jeon, B.-C. Lee || — || align=right | 2.2 km || 
|-id=060 bgcolor=#fefefe
| 72060 Hohhot ||  ||  || December 23, 2000 || Desert Beaver || W. K. Y. Yeung || NYS || align=right | 2.0 km || 
|-id=061 bgcolor=#fefefe
| 72061 ||  || — || December 21, 2000 || Socorro || LINEAR || FLO || align=right | 1.9 km || 
|-id=062 bgcolor=#fefefe
| 72062 ||  || — || December 24, 2000 || Ondřejov || P. Kušnirák, U. Babiaková || V || align=right | 1.8 km || 
|-id=063 bgcolor=#fefefe
| 72063 ||  || — || December 20, 2000 || Socorro || LINEAR || V || align=right | 1.8 km || 
|-id=064 bgcolor=#fefefe
| 72064 ||  || — || December 21, 2000 || Kitt Peak || Spacewatch || — || align=right | 1.7 km || 
|-id=065 bgcolor=#fefefe
| 72065 ||  || — || December 27, 2000 || Kitt Peak || Spacewatch || — || align=right | 1.9 km || 
|-id=066 bgcolor=#E9E9E9
| 72066 ||  || — || December 29, 2000 || Desert Beaver || W. K. Y. Yeung || MAR || align=right | 3.8 km || 
|-id=067 bgcolor=#d6d6d6
| 72067 ||  || — || December 25, 2000 || Haleakala || NEAT || 627 || align=right | 7.4 km || 
|-id=068 bgcolor=#fefefe
| 72068 ||  || — || December 31, 2000 || Ametlla de Mar || J. Nomen || — || align=right | 1.9 km || 
|-id=069 bgcolor=#fefefe
| 72069 ||  || — || December 31, 2000 || Ametlla de Mar || J. Nomen || — || align=right | 2.8 km || 
|-id=070 bgcolor=#fefefe
| 72070 ||  || — || December 31, 2000 || Ondřejov || P. Kušnirák, U. Babiaková || — || align=right | 1.9 km || 
|-id=071 bgcolor=#fefefe
| 72071 Gábor ||  ||  || December 31, 2000 || Piszkéstető || K. Sárneczky, L. Kiss || — || align=right | 1.9 km || 
|-id=072 bgcolor=#E9E9E9
| 72072 ||  || — || December 28, 2000 || Socorro || LINEAR || — || align=right | 2.9 km || 
|-id=073 bgcolor=#fefefe
| 72073 ||  || — || December 28, 2000 || Socorro || LINEAR || — || align=right | 2.1 km || 
|-id=074 bgcolor=#fefefe
| 72074 ||  || — || December 30, 2000 || Socorro || LINEAR || — || align=right | 2.6 km || 
|-id=075 bgcolor=#E9E9E9
| 72075 ||  || — || December 30, 2000 || Socorro || LINEAR || — || align=right | 2.3 km || 
|-id=076 bgcolor=#fefefe
| 72076 ||  || — || December 30, 2000 || Socorro || LINEAR || MAS || align=right | 1.7 km || 
|-id=077 bgcolor=#fefefe
| 72077 ||  || — || December 30, 2000 || Socorro || LINEAR || — || align=right | 2.0 km || 
|-id=078 bgcolor=#fefefe
| 72078 ||  || — || December 30, 2000 || Socorro || LINEAR || — || align=right | 2.5 km || 
|-id=079 bgcolor=#fefefe
| 72079 ||  || — || December 30, 2000 || Socorro || LINEAR || V || align=right | 1.5 km || 
|-id=080 bgcolor=#fefefe
| 72080 ||  || — || December 30, 2000 || Socorro || LINEAR || FLO || align=right | 1.7 km || 
|-id=081 bgcolor=#fefefe
| 72081 ||  || — || December 30, 2000 || Socorro || LINEAR || NYS || align=right | 1.5 km || 
|-id=082 bgcolor=#fefefe
| 72082 ||  || — || December 30, 2000 || Socorro || LINEAR || — || align=right | 1.6 km || 
|-id=083 bgcolor=#fefefe
| 72083 ||  || — || December 30, 2000 || Socorro || LINEAR || — || align=right | 1.6 km || 
|-id=084 bgcolor=#fefefe
| 72084 ||  || — || December 30, 2000 || Socorro || LINEAR || V || align=right | 1.6 km || 
|-id=085 bgcolor=#fefefe
| 72085 ||  || — || December 30, 2000 || Socorro || LINEAR || FLO || align=right | 1.5 km || 
|-id=086 bgcolor=#fefefe
| 72086 ||  || — || December 30, 2000 || Socorro || LINEAR || V || align=right | 1.5 km || 
|-id=087 bgcolor=#fefefe
| 72087 ||  || — || December 30, 2000 || Socorro || LINEAR || — || align=right | 1.2 km || 
|-id=088 bgcolor=#fefefe
| 72088 ||  || — || December 30, 2000 || Socorro || LINEAR || — || align=right | 2.4 km || 
|-id=089 bgcolor=#fefefe
| 72089 ||  || — || December 30, 2000 || Socorro || LINEAR || — || align=right | 2.1 km || 
|-id=090 bgcolor=#fefefe
| 72090 ||  || — || December 30, 2000 || Socorro || LINEAR || — || align=right | 2.1 km || 
|-id=091 bgcolor=#fefefe
| 72091 ||  || — || December 30, 2000 || Socorro || LINEAR || — || align=right | 2.0 km || 
|-id=092 bgcolor=#fefefe
| 72092 ||  || — || December 30, 2000 || Socorro || LINEAR || — || align=right | 2.5 km || 
|-id=093 bgcolor=#fefefe
| 72093 ||  || — || December 30, 2000 || Socorro || LINEAR || MAS || align=right | 1.7 km || 
|-id=094 bgcolor=#E9E9E9
| 72094 ||  || — || December 30, 2000 || Socorro || LINEAR || — || align=right | 4.8 km || 
|-id=095 bgcolor=#E9E9E9
| 72095 ||  || — || December 30, 2000 || Socorro || LINEAR || — || align=right | 6.4 km || 
|-id=096 bgcolor=#fefefe
| 72096 ||  || — || December 30, 2000 || Socorro || LINEAR || — || align=right | 2.6 km || 
|-id=097 bgcolor=#fefefe
| 72097 ||  || — || December 30, 2000 || Socorro || LINEAR || V || align=right | 2.8 km || 
|-id=098 bgcolor=#fefefe
| 72098 ||  || — || December 30, 2000 || Socorro || LINEAR || V || align=right | 1.7 km || 
|-id=099 bgcolor=#fefefe
| 72099 ||  || — || December 30, 2000 || Socorro || LINEAR || — || align=right | 2.0 km || 
|-id=100 bgcolor=#fefefe
| 72100 ||  || — || December 30, 2000 || Socorro || LINEAR || V || align=right | 1.3 km || 
|}

72101–72200 

|-bgcolor=#fefefe
| 72101 ||  || — || December 30, 2000 || Socorro || LINEAR || NYS || align=right | 1.3 km || 
|-id=102 bgcolor=#fefefe
| 72102 ||  || — || December 30, 2000 || Socorro || LINEAR || NYS || align=right | 3.6 km || 
|-id=103 bgcolor=#fefefe
| 72103 ||  || — || December 30, 2000 || Socorro || LINEAR || — || align=right | 2.1 km || 
|-id=104 bgcolor=#fefefe
| 72104 ||  || — || December 30, 2000 || Socorro || LINEAR || — || align=right | 1.7 km || 
|-id=105 bgcolor=#fefefe
| 72105 ||  || — || December 30, 2000 || Socorro || LINEAR || NYS || align=right | 4.2 km || 
|-id=106 bgcolor=#fefefe
| 72106 ||  || — || December 30, 2000 || Socorro || LINEAR || — || align=right | 2.3 km || 
|-id=107 bgcolor=#E9E9E9
| 72107 ||  || — || December 30, 2000 || Socorro || LINEAR || — || align=right | 2.6 km || 
|-id=108 bgcolor=#fefefe
| 72108 ||  || — || December 30, 2000 || Socorro || LINEAR || — || align=right | 2.3 km || 
|-id=109 bgcolor=#E9E9E9
| 72109 ||  || — || December 30, 2000 || Socorro || LINEAR || PAD || align=right | 5.0 km || 
|-id=110 bgcolor=#fefefe
| 72110 ||  || — || December 30, 2000 || Socorro || LINEAR || V || align=right | 1.3 km || 
|-id=111 bgcolor=#fefefe
| 72111 ||  || — || December 30, 2000 || Socorro || LINEAR || — || align=right | 1.5 km || 
|-id=112 bgcolor=#fefefe
| 72112 ||  || — || December 30, 2000 || Socorro || LINEAR || EUT || align=right | 1.2 km || 
|-id=113 bgcolor=#fefefe
| 72113 ||  || — || December 30, 2000 || Socorro || LINEAR || — || align=right | 1.9 km || 
|-id=114 bgcolor=#fefefe
| 72114 ||  || — || December 30, 2000 || Socorro || LINEAR || — || align=right | 2.9 km || 
|-id=115 bgcolor=#E9E9E9
| 72115 ||  || — || December 30, 2000 || Socorro || LINEAR || — || align=right | 3.4 km || 
|-id=116 bgcolor=#fefefe
| 72116 ||  || — || December 30, 2000 || Socorro || LINEAR || — || align=right | 2.1 km || 
|-id=117 bgcolor=#fefefe
| 72117 ||  || — || December 30, 2000 || Socorro || LINEAR || — || align=right | 1.9 km || 
|-id=118 bgcolor=#fefefe
| 72118 ||  || — || December 30, 2000 || Socorro || LINEAR || — || align=right | 3.9 km || 
|-id=119 bgcolor=#fefefe
| 72119 ||  || — || December 30, 2000 || Socorro || LINEAR || KLI || align=right | 5.9 km || 
|-id=120 bgcolor=#fefefe
| 72120 ||  || — || December 30, 2000 || Socorro || LINEAR || NYS || align=right | 1.9 km || 
|-id=121 bgcolor=#fefefe
| 72121 ||  || — || December 30, 2000 || Socorro || LINEAR || V || align=right | 1.5 km || 
|-id=122 bgcolor=#fefefe
| 72122 ||  || — || December 30, 2000 || Socorro || LINEAR || — || align=right | 2.0 km || 
|-id=123 bgcolor=#E9E9E9
| 72123 ||  || — || December 16, 2000 || Kitt Peak || Spacewatch || — || align=right | 3.6 km || 
|-id=124 bgcolor=#E9E9E9
| 72124 ||  || — || December 28, 2000 || Socorro || LINEAR || — || align=right | 2.4 km || 
|-id=125 bgcolor=#fefefe
| 72125 ||  || — || December 28, 2000 || Socorro || LINEAR || NYS || align=right | 1.6 km || 
|-id=126 bgcolor=#E9E9E9
| 72126 ||  || — || December 28, 2000 || Socorro || LINEAR || — || align=right | 6.2 km || 
|-id=127 bgcolor=#fefefe
| 72127 ||  || — || December 30, 2000 || Socorro || LINEAR || V || align=right | 1.7 km || 
|-id=128 bgcolor=#fefefe
| 72128 ||  || — || December 30, 2000 || Socorro || LINEAR || — || align=right | 1.4 km || 
|-id=129 bgcolor=#fefefe
| 72129 ||  || — || December 30, 2000 || Socorro || LINEAR || V || align=right | 1.4 km || 
|-id=130 bgcolor=#E9E9E9
| 72130 ||  || — || December 30, 2000 || Socorro || LINEAR || — || align=right | 3.2 km || 
|-id=131 bgcolor=#fefefe
| 72131 ||  || — || December 30, 2000 || Socorro || LINEAR || — || align=right | 2.4 km || 
|-id=132 bgcolor=#fefefe
| 72132 ||  || — || December 30, 2000 || Socorro || LINEAR || FLO || align=right | 3.1 km || 
|-id=133 bgcolor=#fefefe
| 72133 ||  || — || December 30, 2000 || Socorro || LINEAR || V || align=right | 1.8 km || 
|-id=134 bgcolor=#fefefe
| 72134 ||  || — || December 30, 2000 || Socorro || LINEAR || FLO || align=right | 1.8 km || 
|-id=135 bgcolor=#fefefe
| 72135 ||  || — || December 30, 2000 || Socorro || LINEAR || NYS || align=right | 1.5 km || 
|-id=136 bgcolor=#fefefe
| 72136 ||  || — || December 30, 2000 || Socorro || LINEAR || FLO || align=right | 2.9 km || 
|-id=137 bgcolor=#fefefe
| 72137 ||  || — || December 30, 2000 || Socorro || LINEAR || NYS || align=right | 1.6 km || 
|-id=138 bgcolor=#fefefe
| 72138 ||  || — || December 30, 2000 || Socorro || LINEAR || FLO || align=right | 1.6 km || 
|-id=139 bgcolor=#fefefe
| 72139 ||  || — || December 30, 2000 || Socorro || LINEAR || NYS || align=right | 6.9 km || 
|-id=140 bgcolor=#E9E9E9
| 72140 ||  || — || December 30, 2000 || Socorro || LINEAR || — || align=right | 7.4 km || 
|-id=141 bgcolor=#fefefe
| 72141 ||  || — || December 30, 2000 || Socorro || LINEAR || V || align=right | 1.9 km || 
|-id=142 bgcolor=#fefefe
| 72142 ||  || — || December 30, 2000 || Socorro || LINEAR || FLO || align=right | 2.3 km || 
|-id=143 bgcolor=#fefefe
| 72143 ||  || — || December 30, 2000 || Socorro || LINEAR || ERI || align=right | 4.7 km || 
|-id=144 bgcolor=#fefefe
| 72144 ||  || — || December 30, 2000 || Socorro || LINEAR || — || align=right | 1.9 km || 
|-id=145 bgcolor=#fefefe
| 72145 ||  || — || December 30, 2000 || Socorro || LINEAR || V || align=right | 1.8 km || 
|-id=146 bgcolor=#fefefe
| 72146 ||  || — || December 30, 2000 || Socorro || LINEAR || NYS || align=right | 3.3 km || 
|-id=147 bgcolor=#fefefe
| 72147 ||  || — || December 30, 2000 || Socorro || LINEAR || — || align=right | 1.8 km || 
|-id=148 bgcolor=#fefefe
| 72148 ||  || — || December 30, 2000 || Socorro || LINEAR || NYS || align=right | 4.1 km || 
|-id=149 bgcolor=#fefefe
| 72149 ||  || — || December 30, 2000 || Socorro || LINEAR || — || align=right | 3.9 km || 
|-id=150 bgcolor=#fefefe
| 72150 ||  || — || December 30, 2000 || Socorro || LINEAR || V || align=right | 1.9 km || 
|-id=151 bgcolor=#E9E9E9
| 72151 ||  || — || December 30, 2000 || Socorro || LINEAR || — || align=right | 2.3 km || 
|-id=152 bgcolor=#fefefe
| 72152 ||  || — || December 30, 2000 || Socorro || LINEAR || MAS || align=right | 1.5 km || 
|-id=153 bgcolor=#fefefe
| 72153 ||  || — || December 30, 2000 || Socorro || LINEAR || — || align=right | 1.8 km || 
|-id=154 bgcolor=#fefefe
| 72154 ||  || — || December 30, 2000 || Socorro || LINEAR || — || align=right | 1.9 km || 
|-id=155 bgcolor=#E9E9E9
| 72155 ||  || — || December 30, 2000 || Socorro || LINEAR || VIB || align=right | 5.1 km || 
|-id=156 bgcolor=#fefefe
| 72156 ||  || — || December 30, 2000 || Socorro || LINEAR || — || align=right | 4.6 km || 
|-id=157 bgcolor=#fefefe
| 72157 ||  || — || December 30, 2000 || Socorro || LINEAR || NYS || align=right | 1.3 km || 
|-id=158 bgcolor=#fefefe
| 72158 ||  || — || December 30, 2000 || Socorro || LINEAR || — || align=right | 1.8 km || 
|-id=159 bgcolor=#fefefe
| 72159 ||  || — || December 28, 2000 || Socorro || LINEAR || V || align=right | 1.6 km || 
|-id=160 bgcolor=#fefefe
| 72160 ||  || — || December 28, 2000 || Socorro || LINEAR || V || align=right | 1.6 km || 
|-id=161 bgcolor=#d6d6d6
| 72161 ||  || — || December 28, 2000 || Socorro || LINEAR || — || align=right | 9.8 km || 
|-id=162 bgcolor=#E9E9E9
| 72162 ||  || — || December 28, 2000 || Socorro || LINEAR || — || align=right | 3.0 km || 
|-id=163 bgcolor=#E9E9E9
| 72163 ||  || — || December 28, 2000 || Socorro || LINEAR || — || align=right | 3.2 km || 
|-id=164 bgcolor=#E9E9E9
| 72164 ||  || — || December 28, 2000 || Socorro || LINEAR || EUN || align=right | 4.2 km || 
|-id=165 bgcolor=#E9E9E9
| 72165 ||  || — || December 28, 2000 || Socorro || LINEAR || — || align=right | 3.4 km || 
|-id=166 bgcolor=#E9E9E9
| 72166 ||  || — || December 28, 2000 || Socorro || LINEAR || — || align=right | 5.4 km || 
|-id=167 bgcolor=#E9E9E9
| 72167 ||  || — || December 30, 2000 || Socorro || LINEAR || — || align=right | 4.8 km || 
|-id=168 bgcolor=#fefefe
| 72168 ||  || — || December 30, 2000 || Socorro || LINEAR || — || align=right | 1.4 km || 
|-id=169 bgcolor=#fefefe
| 72169 ||  || — || December 30, 2000 || Socorro || LINEAR || SUL || align=right | 4.5 km || 
|-id=170 bgcolor=#fefefe
| 72170 ||  || — || December 30, 2000 || Socorro || LINEAR || NYS || align=right | 1.8 km || 
|-id=171 bgcolor=#E9E9E9
| 72171 ||  || — || December 30, 2000 || Socorro || LINEAR || — || align=right | 3.6 km || 
|-id=172 bgcolor=#fefefe
| 72172 ||  || — || December 30, 2000 || Socorro || LINEAR || FLO || align=right | 1.6 km || 
|-id=173 bgcolor=#fefefe
| 72173 ||  || — || December 30, 2000 || Socorro || LINEAR || — || align=right | 1.7 km || 
|-id=174 bgcolor=#fefefe
| 72174 ||  || — || December 30, 2000 || Socorro || LINEAR || — || align=right | 2.5 km || 
|-id=175 bgcolor=#E9E9E9
| 72175 ||  || — || December 30, 2000 || Socorro || LINEAR || — || align=right | 2.3 km || 
|-id=176 bgcolor=#fefefe
| 72176 ||  || — || December 30, 2000 || Socorro || LINEAR || — || align=right | 1.9 km || 
|-id=177 bgcolor=#fefefe
| 72177 ||  || — || December 30, 2000 || Socorro || LINEAR || NYS || align=right | 3.4 km || 
|-id=178 bgcolor=#fefefe
| 72178 ||  || — || December 30, 2000 || Socorro || LINEAR || — || align=right | 2.0 km || 
|-id=179 bgcolor=#fefefe
| 72179 ||  || — || December 30, 2000 || Socorro || LINEAR || — || align=right | 1.9 km || 
|-id=180 bgcolor=#fefefe
| 72180 ||  || — || December 30, 2000 || Socorro || LINEAR || NYS || align=right | 2.6 km || 
|-id=181 bgcolor=#fefefe
| 72181 ||  || — || December 30, 2000 || Socorro || LINEAR || — || align=right | 1.9 km || 
|-id=182 bgcolor=#fefefe
| 72182 ||  || — || December 30, 2000 || Socorro || LINEAR || NYS || align=right | 1.6 km || 
|-id=183 bgcolor=#fefefe
| 72183 ||  || — || December 30, 2000 || Socorro || LINEAR || NYS || align=right | 2.0 km || 
|-id=184 bgcolor=#fefefe
| 72184 ||  || — || December 30, 2000 || Socorro || LINEAR || — || align=right | 2.4 km || 
|-id=185 bgcolor=#fefefe
| 72185 ||  || — || December 30, 2000 || Socorro || LINEAR || — || align=right | 2.6 km || 
|-id=186 bgcolor=#E9E9E9
| 72186 ||  || — || December 30, 2000 || Socorro || LINEAR || — || align=right | 3.7 km || 
|-id=187 bgcolor=#fefefe
| 72187 ||  || — || December 19, 2000 || Socorro || LINEAR || FLO || align=right | 2.2 km || 
|-id=188 bgcolor=#E9E9E9
| 72188 ||  || — || December 19, 2000 || Haleakala || NEAT || EUN || align=right | 4.9 km || 
|-id=189 bgcolor=#fefefe
| 72189 ||  || — || December 21, 2000 || Socorro || LINEAR || FLO || align=right | 2.2 km || 
|-id=190 bgcolor=#fefefe
| 72190 ||  || — || December 29, 2000 || Anderson Mesa || LONEOS || — || align=right | 2.0 km || 
|-id=191 bgcolor=#E9E9E9
| 72191 ||  || — || December 29, 2000 || Anderson Mesa || LONEOS || — || align=right | 3.1 km || 
|-id=192 bgcolor=#fefefe
| 72192 ||  || — || December 29, 2000 || Anderson Mesa || LONEOS || — || align=right | 2.3 km || 
|-id=193 bgcolor=#fefefe
| 72193 ||  || — || December 29, 2000 || Kitt Peak || Spacewatch || — || align=right | 1.9 km || 
|-id=194 bgcolor=#E9E9E9
| 72194 ||  || — || December 29, 2000 || Kitt Peak || Spacewatch || — || align=right | 3.6 km || 
|-id=195 bgcolor=#fefefe
| 72195 ||  || — || December 29, 2000 || Haleakala || NEAT || NYS || align=right | 1.7 km || 
|-id=196 bgcolor=#fefefe
| 72196 ||  || — || December 29, 2000 || Haleakala || NEAT || V || align=right | 1.9 km || 
|-id=197 bgcolor=#fefefe
| 72197 ||  || — || December 29, 2000 || Haleakala || NEAT || FLO || align=right | 1.5 km || 
|-id=198 bgcolor=#fefefe
| 72198 ||  || — || December 30, 2000 || Socorro || LINEAR || — || align=right | 1.7 km || 
|-id=199 bgcolor=#E9E9E9
| 72199 ||  || — || December 30, 2000 || Anderson Mesa || LONEOS || — || align=right | 2.7 km || 
|-id=200 bgcolor=#E9E9E9
| 72200 ||  || — || December 30, 2000 || Anderson Mesa || LONEOS || POS || align=right | 7.1 km || 
|}

72201–72300 

|-bgcolor=#fefefe
| 72201 ||  || — || December 30, 2000 || Kitt Peak || Spacewatch || — || align=right | 1.6 km || 
|-id=202 bgcolor=#E9E9E9
| 72202 ||  || — || December 30, 2000 || Kitt Peak || Spacewatch || — || align=right | 5.5 km || 
|-id=203 bgcolor=#E9E9E9
| 72203 ||  || — || December 31, 2000 || Anderson Mesa || LONEOS || — || align=right | 2.6 km || 
|-id=204 bgcolor=#FA8072
| 72204 ||  || — || December 31, 2000 || Kitt Peak || Spacewatch || — || align=right | 2.1 km || 
|-id=205 bgcolor=#fefefe
| 72205 ||  || — || December 23, 2000 || Socorro || LINEAR || — || align=right | 2.0 km || 
|-id=206 bgcolor=#fefefe
| 72206 ||  || — || December 27, 2000 || Anderson Mesa || LONEOS || — || align=right | 2.2 km || 
|-id=207 bgcolor=#E9E9E9
| 72207 ||  || — || December 27, 2000 || Anderson Mesa || LONEOS || — || align=right | 2.5 km || 
|-id=208 bgcolor=#E9E9E9
| 72208 ||  || — || December 27, 2000 || Anderson Mesa || LONEOS || MAR || align=right | 3.0 km || 
|-id=209 bgcolor=#fefefe
| 72209 ||  || — || December 19, 2000 || Haleakala || NEAT || V || align=right | 1.6 km || 
|-id=210 bgcolor=#E9E9E9
| 72210 || 2001 AK || — || January 1, 2001 || Kitt Peak || Spacewatch || — || align=right | 2.0 km || 
|-id=211 bgcolor=#E9E9E9
| 72211 || 2001 AS || — || January 2, 2001 || Oizumi || T. Kobayashi || — || align=right | 2.3 km || 
|-id=212 bgcolor=#fefefe
| 72212 || 2001 AT || — || January 2, 2001 || Oizumi || T. Kobayashi || MAS || align=right | 2.0 km || 
|-id=213 bgcolor=#d6d6d6
| 72213 || 2001 AU || — || January 2, 2001 || Oizumi || T. Kobayashi || — || align=right | 6.1 km || 
|-id=214 bgcolor=#E9E9E9
| 72214 ||  || — || January 2, 2001 || Socorro || LINEAR || — || align=right | 2.9 km || 
|-id=215 bgcolor=#fefefe
| 72215 ||  || — || January 2, 2001 || Socorro || LINEAR || — || align=right | 2.3 km || 
|-id=216 bgcolor=#fefefe
| 72216 ||  || — || January 2, 2001 || Socorro || LINEAR || — || align=right | 2.2 km || 
|-id=217 bgcolor=#E9E9E9
| 72217 ||  || — || January 2, 2001 || Socorro || LINEAR || ADE || align=right | 5.7 km || 
|-id=218 bgcolor=#fefefe
| 72218 ||  || — || January 2, 2001 || Socorro || LINEAR || — || align=right | 1.8 km || 
|-id=219 bgcolor=#fefefe
| 72219 ||  || — || January 2, 2001 || Socorro || LINEAR || — || align=right | 2.3 km || 
|-id=220 bgcolor=#fefefe
| 72220 ||  || — || January 2, 2001 || Socorro || LINEAR || — || align=right | 1.7 km || 
|-id=221 bgcolor=#fefefe
| 72221 ||  || — || January 2, 2001 || Socorro || LINEAR || — || align=right | 2.0 km || 
|-id=222 bgcolor=#E9E9E9
| 72222 ||  || — || January 2, 2001 || Socorro || LINEAR || — || align=right | 2.0 km || 
|-id=223 bgcolor=#fefefe
| 72223 ||  || — || January 2, 2001 || Socorro || LINEAR || V || align=right | 1.3 km || 
|-id=224 bgcolor=#E9E9E9
| 72224 ||  || — || January 2, 2001 || Socorro || LINEAR || — || align=right | 2.0 km || 
|-id=225 bgcolor=#fefefe
| 72225 ||  || — || January 2, 2001 || Socorro || LINEAR || FLO || align=right | 1.3 km || 
|-id=226 bgcolor=#fefefe
| 72226 ||  || — || January 2, 2001 || Socorro || LINEAR || — || align=right | 1.9 km || 
|-id=227 bgcolor=#fefefe
| 72227 ||  || — || January 2, 2001 || Socorro || LINEAR || — || align=right | 1.9 km || 
|-id=228 bgcolor=#E9E9E9
| 72228 ||  || — || January 2, 2001 || Socorro || LINEAR || — || align=right | 3.5 km || 
|-id=229 bgcolor=#fefefe
| 72229 ||  || — || January 2, 2001 || Socorro || LINEAR || — || align=right | 2.6 km || 
|-id=230 bgcolor=#fefefe
| 72230 ||  || — || January 2, 2001 || Socorro || LINEAR || ERI || align=right | 4.7 km || 
|-id=231 bgcolor=#fefefe
| 72231 ||  || — || January 2, 2001 || Socorro || LINEAR || NYS || align=right | 4.4 km || 
|-id=232 bgcolor=#fefefe
| 72232 ||  || — || January 2, 2001 || Socorro || LINEAR || V || align=right | 1.6 km || 
|-id=233 bgcolor=#fefefe
| 72233 ||  || — || January 2, 2001 || Socorro || LINEAR || — || align=right | 2.8 km || 
|-id=234 bgcolor=#fefefe
| 72234 ||  || — || January 2, 2001 || Socorro || LINEAR || — || align=right | 2.5 km || 
|-id=235 bgcolor=#fefefe
| 72235 ||  || — || January 2, 2001 || Socorro || LINEAR || — || align=right | 2.0 km || 
|-id=236 bgcolor=#E9E9E9
| 72236 ||  || — || January 4, 2001 || Haleakala || NEAT || — || align=right | 6.2 km || 
|-id=237 bgcolor=#fefefe
| 72237 ||  || — || January 3, 2001 || Socorro || LINEAR || — || align=right | 1.9 km || 
|-id=238 bgcolor=#fefefe
| 72238 ||  || — || January 3, 2001 || Socorro || LINEAR || — || align=right | 1.8 km || 
|-id=239 bgcolor=#fefefe
| 72239 ||  || — || January 3, 2001 || Socorro || LINEAR || — || align=right | 2.1 km || 
|-id=240 bgcolor=#fefefe
| 72240 ||  || — || January 3, 2001 || Socorro || LINEAR || — || align=right | 2.0 km || 
|-id=241 bgcolor=#E9E9E9
| 72241 ||  || — || January 3, 2001 || Socorro || LINEAR || — || align=right | 2.1 km || 
|-id=242 bgcolor=#fefefe
| 72242 ||  || — || January 3, 2001 || Socorro || LINEAR || — || align=right | 2.0 km || 
|-id=243 bgcolor=#fefefe
| 72243 ||  || — || January 4, 2001 || Socorro || LINEAR || — || align=right | 2.1 km || 
|-id=244 bgcolor=#E9E9E9
| 72244 ||  || — || January 4, 2001 || Socorro || LINEAR || GEF || align=right | 4.1 km || 
|-id=245 bgcolor=#fefefe
| 72245 ||  || — || January 5, 2001 || Socorro || LINEAR || — || align=right | 2.1 km || 
|-id=246 bgcolor=#fefefe
| 72246 ||  || — || January 5, 2001 || Socorro || LINEAR || V || align=right | 2.1 km || 
|-id=247 bgcolor=#fefefe
| 72247 ||  || — || January 5, 2001 || Socorro || LINEAR || — || align=right | 2.4 km || 
|-id=248 bgcolor=#fefefe
| 72248 ||  || — || January 6, 2001 || Socorro || LINEAR || PHO || align=right | 2.0 km || 
|-id=249 bgcolor=#fefefe
| 72249 ||  || — || January 4, 2001 || Socorro || LINEAR || — || align=right | 2.0 km || 
|-id=250 bgcolor=#fefefe
| 72250 ||  || — || January 4, 2001 || Socorro || LINEAR || — || align=right | 2.3 km || 
|-id=251 bgcolor=#E9E9E9
| 72251 ||  || — || January 4, 2001 || Socorro || LINEAR || — || align=right | 3.4 km || 
|-id=252 bgcolor=#fefefe
| 72252 ||  || — || January 4, 2001 || Socorro || LINEAR || — || align=right | 1.9 km || 
|-id=253 bgcolor=#fefefe
| 72253 ||  || — || January 4, 2001 || Socorro || LINEAR || — || align=right | 1.9 km || 
|-id=254 bgcolor=#fefefe
| 72254 ||  || — || January 4, 2001 || Socorro || LINEAR || NYS || align=right | 3.4 km || 
|-id=255 bgcolor=#fefefe
| 72255 ||  || — || January 4, 2001 || Socorro || LINEAR || — || align=right | 3.6 km || 
|-id=256 bgcolor=#fefefe
| 72256 ||  || — || January 4, 2001 || Socorro || LINEAR || — || align=right | 2.7 km || 
|-id=257 bgcolor=#fefefe
| 72257 ||  || — || January 4, 2001 || Socorro || LINEAR || — || align=right | 2.4 km || 
|-id=258 bgcolor=#fefefe
| 72258 ||  || — || January 4, 2001 || Socorro || LINEAR || — || align=right | 1.9 km || 
|-id=259 bgcolor=#fefefe
| 72259 ||  || — || January 4, 2001 || Socorro || LINEAR || V || align=right | 1.7 km || 
|-id=260 bgcolor=#fefefe
| 72260 ||  || — || January 4, 2001 || Socorro || LINEAR || — || align=right | 2.0 km || 
|-id=261 bgcolor=#fefefe
| 72261 ||  || — || January 4, 2001 || Socorro || LINEAR || FLO || align=right | 1.4 km || 
|-id=262 bgcolor=#fefefe
| 72262 ||  || — || January 5, 2001 || Socorro || LINEAR || V || align=right | 1.6 km || 
|-id=263 bgcolor=#fefefe
| 72263 ||  || — || January 5, 2001 || Socorro || LINEAR || V || align=right | 1.9 km || 
|-id=264 bgcolor=#E9E9E9
| 72264 ||  || — || January 5, 2001 || Socorro || LINEAR || MAR || align=right | 4.9 km || 
|-id=265 bgcolor=#E9E9E9
| 72265 ||  || — || January 3, 2001 || Socorro || LINEAR || — || align=right | 1.9 km || 
|-id=266 bgcolor=#fefefe
| 72266 ||  || — || January 3, 2001 || Socorro || LINEAR || — || align=right | 2.4 km || 
|-id=267 bgcolor=#E9E9E9
| 72267 ||  || — || January 3, 2001 || Socorro || LINEAR || — || align=right | 3.6 km || 
|-id=268 bgcolor=#fefefe
| 72268 ||  || — || January 3, 2001 || Socorro || LINEAR || — || align=right | 1.8 km || 
|-id=269 bgcolor=#fefefe
| 72269 ||  || — || January 3, 2001 || Socorro || LINEAR || — || align=right | 1.8 km || 
|-id=270 bgcolor=#fefefe
| 72270 ||  || — || January 4, 2001 || Anderson Mesa || LONEOS || — || align=right | 2.0 km || 
|-id=271 bgcolor=#fefefe
| 72271 ||  || — || January 4, 2001 || Anderson Mesa || LONEOS || — || align=right | 2.0 km || 
|-id=272 bgcolor=#fefefe
| 72272 ||  || — || January 4, 2001 || Anderson Mesa || LONEOS || — || align=right | 1.8 km || 
|-id=273 bgcolor=#fefefe
| 72273 ||  || — || January 15, 2001 || Oizumi || T. Kobayashi || NYS || align=right | 4.2 km || 
|-id=274 bgcolor=#E9E9E9
| 72274 ||  || — || January 15, 2001 || Oizumi || T. Kobayashi || GEF || align=right | 3.0 km || 
|-id=275 bgcolor=#fefefe
| 72275 ||  || — || January 15, 2001 || Oizumi || T. Kobayashi || — || align=right | 1.9 km || 
|-id=276 bgcolor=#fefefe
| 72276 ||  || — || January 5, 2001 || Socorro || LINEAR || V || align=right | 2.4 km || 
|-id=277 bgcolor=#E9E9E9
| 72277 ||  || — || January 15, 2001 || Kitt Peak || Spacewatch || — || align=right | 2.7 km || 
|-id=278 bgcolor=#fefefe
| 72278 ||  || — || January 12, 2001 || Kvistaberg || UDAS || — || align=right | 2.9 km || 
|-id=279 bgcolor=#E9E9E9
| 72279 || 2001 BT || — || January 17, 2001 || Oizumi || T. Kobayashi || — || align=right | 2.9 km || 
|-id=280 bgcolor=#E9E9E9
| 72280 ||  || — || January 16, 2001 || Haleakala || NEAT || EUN || align=right | 3.1 km || 
|-id=281 bgcolor=#fefefe
| 72281 ||  || — || January 18, 2001 || Socorro || LINEAR || V || align=right | 1.9 km || 
|-id=282 bgcolor=#E9E9E9
| 72282 ||  || — || January 19, 2001 || Socorro || LINEAR || — || align=right | 4.3 km || 
|-id=283 bgcolor=#fefefe
| 72283 ||  || — || January 19, 2001 || Socorro || LINEAR || — || align=right | 2.1 km || 
|-id=284 bgcolor=#fefefe
| 72284 ||  || — || January 19, 2001 || Socorro || LINEAR || — || align=right | 2.2 km || 
|-id=285 bgcolor=#E9E9E9
| 72285 ||  || — || January 19, 2001 || Socorro || LINEAR || — || align=right | 2.6 km || 
|-id=286 bgcolor=#E9E9E9
| 72286 ||  || — || January 19, 2001 || Socorro || LINEAR || — || align=right | 3.1 km || 
|-id=287 bgcolor=#E9E9E9
| 72287 ||  || — || January 16, 2001 || Haleakala || NEAT || — || align=right | 2.6 km || 
|-id=288 bgcolor=#E9E9E9
| 72288 ||  || — || January 21, 2001 || Socorro || LINEAR || — || align=right | 3.1 km || 
|-id=289 bgcolor=#E9E9E9
| 72289 ||  || — || January 21, 2001 || Oizumi || T. Kobayashi || — || align=right | 3.7 km || 
|-id=290 bgcolor=#E9E9E9
| 72290 ||  || — || January 21, 2001 || Oizumi || T. Kobayashi || — || align=right | 4.4 km || 
|-id=291 bgcolor=#E9E9E9
| 72291 ||  || — || January 18, 2001 || Socorro || LINEAR || — || align=right | 2.7 km || 
|-id=292 bgcolor=#fefefe
| 72292 ||  || — || January 20, 2001 || Socorro || LINEAR || ERI || align=right | 4.6 km || 
|-id=293 bgcolor=#fefefe
| 72293 ||  || — || January 20, 2001 || Socorro || LINEAR || NYS || align=right | 1.5 km || 
|-id=294 bgcolor=#fefefe
| 72294 ||  || — || January 20, 2001 || Socorro || LINEAR || MAS || align=right | 1.8 km || 
|-id=295 bgcolor=#fefefe
| 72295 ||  || — || January 20, 2001 || Socorro || LINEAR || NYSfast? || align=right | 1.7 km || 
|-id=296 bgcolor=#fefefe
| 72296 ||  || — || January 20, 2001 || Socorro || LINEAR || NYS || align=right | 1.3 km || 
|-id=297 bgcolor=#fefefe
| 72297 ||  || — || January 20, 2001 || Socorro || LINEAR || FLO || align=right | 1.7 km || 
|-id=298 bgcolor=#fefefe
| 72298 ||  || — || January 20, 2001 || Socorro || LINEAR || V || align=right | 1.4 km || 
|-id=299 bgcolor=#fefefe
| 72299 ||  || — || January 20, 2001 || Socorro || LINEAR || — || align=right | 1.4 km || 
|-id=300 bgcolor=#d6d6d6
| 72300 ||  || — || January 20, 2001 || Socorro || LINEAR || — || align=right | 6.0 km || 
|}

72301–72400 

|-bgcolor=#E9E9E9
| 72301 ||  || — || January 20, 2001 || Socorro || LINEAR || — || align=right | 5.4 km || 
|-id=302 bgcolor=#fefefe
| 72302 ||  || — || January 20, 2001 || Socorro || LINEAR || NYS || align=right | 1.2 km || 
|-id=303 bgcolor=#E9E9E9
| 72303 ||  || — || January 20, 2001 || Socorro || LINEAR || — || align=right | 3.9 km || 
|-id=304 bgcolor=#fefefe
| 72304 ||  || — || January 20, 2001 || Socorro || LINEAR || V || align=right | 1.6 km || 
|-id=305 bgcolor=#d6d6d6
| 72305 ||  || — || January 20, 2001 || Socorro || LINEAR || THM || align=right | 7.1 km || 
|-id=306 bgcolor=#E9E9E9
| 72306 ||  || — || January 20, 2001 || Socorro || LINEAR || — || align=right | 2.5 km || 
|-id=307 bgcolor=#E9E9E9
| 72307 ||  || — || January 20, 2001 || Socorro || LINEAR || — || align=right | 2.1 km || 
|-id=308 bgcolor=#fefefe
| 72308 ||  || — || January 20, 2001 || Socorro || LINEAR || ERI || align=right | 4.0 km || 
|-id=309 bgcolor=#fefefe
| 72309 ||  || — || January 19, 2001 || Socorro || LINEAR || V || align=right | 1.5 km || 
|-id=310 bgcolor=#d6d6d6
| 72310 ||  || — || January 23, 2001 || Kitt Peak || Spacewatch || — || align=right | 8.7 km || 
|-id=311 bgcolor=#fefefe
| 72311 ||  || — || January 21, 2001 || Socorro || LINEAR || — || align=right | 3.4 km || 
|-id=312 bgcolor=#fefefe
| 72312 ||  || — || January 19, 2001 || Socorro || LINEAR || — || align=right | 2.0 km || 
|-id=313 bgcolor=#fefefe
| 72313 ||  || — || January 19, 2001 || Socorro || LINEAR || — || align=right | 2.0 km || 
|-id=314 bgcolor=#E9E9E9
| 72314 ||  || — || January 19, 2001 || Socorro || LINEAR || — || align=right | 4.0 km || 
|-id=315 bgcolor=#fefefe
| 72315 ||  || — || January 19, 2001 || Socorro || LINEAR || — || align=right | 2.7 km || 
|-id=316 bgcolor=#fefefe
| 72316 ||  || — || January 19, 2001 || Socorro || LINEAR || — || align=right | 2.3 km || 
|-id=317 bgcolor=#fefefe
| 72317 ||  || — || January 19, 2001 || Socorro || LINEAR || — || align=right | 2.3 km || 
|-id=318 bgcolor=#E9E9E9
| 72318 ||  || — || January 21, 2001 || Socorro || LINEAR || — || align=right | 1.9 km || 
|-id=319 bgcolor=#d6d6d6
| 72319 ||  || — || January 21, 2001 || Socorro || LINEAR || HYG || align=right | 6.5 km || 
|-id=320 bgcolor=#E9E9E9
| 72320 ||  || — || January 21, 2001 || Socorro || LINEAR || — || align=right | 3.4 km || 
|-id=321 bgcolor=#E9E9E9
| 72321 ||  || — || January 21, 2001 || Socorro || LINEAR || — || align=right | 4.0 km || 
|-id=322 bgcolor=#E9E9E9
| 72322 ||  || — || January 21, 2001 || Socorro || LINEAR || EUN || align=right | 3.1 km || 
|-id=323 bgcolor=#E9E9E9
| 72323 ||  || — || January 27, 2001 || Oaxaca || J. M. Roe || EUN || align=right | 2.7 km || 
|-id=324 bgcolor=#E9E9E9
| 72324 ||  || — || January 18, 2001 || Kitt Peak || Spacewatch || — || align=right | 6.2 km || 
|-id=325 bgcolor=#fefefe
| 72325 ||  || — || January 19, 2001 || Socorro || LINEAR || — || align=right | 4.0 km || 
|-id=326 bgcolor=#fefefe
| 72326 ||  || — || January 19, 2001 || Socorro || LINEAR || NYS || align=right | 1.7 km || 
|-id=327 bgcolor=#fefefe
| 72327 ||  || — || January 21, 2001 || Socorro || LINEAR || — || align=right | 2.4 km || 
|-id=328 bgcolor=#fefefe
| 72328 ||  || — || January 26, 2001 || Socorro || LINEAR || FLO || align=right | 2.2 km || 
|-id=329 bgcolor=#E9E9E9
| 72329 ||  || — || January 26, 2001 || Socorro || LINEAR || EUN || align=right | 2.6 km || 
|-id=330 bgcolor=#E9E9E9
| 72330 ||  || — || January 26, 2001 || Socorro || LINEAR || EUN || align=right | 2.8 km || 
|-id=331 bgcolor=#d6d6d6
| 72331 ||  || — || January 26, 2001 || Socorro || LINEAR || — || align=right | 11 km || 
|-id=332 bgcolor=#fefefe
| 72332 ||  || — || January 26, 2001 || Socorro || LINEAR || NYS || align=right | 1.8 km || 
|-id=333 bgcolor=#E9E9E9
| 72333 ||  || — || January 21, 2001 || Socorro || LINEAR || — || align=right | 3.1 km || 
|-id=334 bgcolor=#E9E9E9
| 72334 ||  || — || January 29, 2001 || Socorro || LINEAR || — || align=right | 2.3 km || 
|-id=335 bgcolor=#fefefe
| 72335 ||  || — || January 24, 2001 || Haleakala || NEAT || — || align=right | 4.6 km || 
|-id=336 bgcolor=#E9E9E9
| 72336 ||  || — || January 26, 2001 || Socorro || LINEAR || — || align=right | 2.0 km || 
|-id=337 bgcolor=#fefefe
| 72337 ||  || — || January 29, 2001 || Socorro || LINEAR || V || align=right | 1.8 km || 
|-id=338 bgcolor=#E9E9E9
| 72338 ||  || — || January 29, 2001 || Socorro || LINEAR || MAR || align=right | 4.3 km || 
|-id=339 bgcolor=#fefefe
| 72339 ||  || — || January 29, 2001 || Socorro || LINEAR || V || align=right | 1.8 km || 
|-id=340 bgcolor=#E9E9E9
| 72340 ||  || — || January 29, 2001 || Socorro || LINEAR || — || align=right | 3.4 km || 
|-id=341 bgcolor=#E9E9E9
| 72341 ||  || — || January 26, 2001 || Socorro || LINEAR || — || align=right | 2.4 km || 
|-id=342 bgcolor=#E9E9E9
| 72342 ||  || — || January 26, 2001 || Socorro || LINEAR || — || align=right | 3.8 km || 
|-id=343 bgcolor=#E9E9E9
| 72343 ||  || — || January 31, 2001 || Socorro || LINEAR || — || align=right | 3.1 km || 
|-id=344 bgcolor=#fefefe
| 72344 ||  || — || January 31, 2001 || Socorro || LINEAR || — || align=right | 2.4 km || 
|-id=345 bgcolor=#fefefe
| 72345 ||  || — || January 31, 2001 || Socorro || LINEAR || NYS || align=right | 1.8 km || 
|-id=346 bgcolor=#E9E9E9
| 72346 ||  || — || January 31, 2001 || Socorro || LINEAR || MAR || align=right | 3.0 km || 
|-id=347 bgcolor=#fefefe
| 72347 ||  || — || January 31, 2001 || Socorro || LINEAR || — || align=right | 2.0 km || 
|-id=348 bgcolor=#d6d6d6
| 72348 ||  || — || January 31, 2001 || Socorro || LINEAR || — || align=right | 7.6 km || 
|-id=349 bgcolor=#fefefe
| 72349 ||  || — || January 29, 2001 || Socorro || LINEAR || NYS || align=right | 1.5 km || 
|-id=350 bgcolor=#E9E9E9
| 72350 ||  || — || January 29, 2001 || Socorro || LINEAR || — || align=right | 2.9 km || 
|-id=351 bgcolor=#fefefe
| 72351 ||  || — || January 29, 2001 || Socorro || LINEAR || — || align=right | 2.2 km || 
|-id=352 bgcolor=#d6d6d6
| 72352 ||  || — || January 31, 2001 || Socorro || LINEAR || BRA || align=right | 5.0 km || 
|-id=353 bgcolor=#E9E9E9
| 72353 ||  || — || January 27, 2001 || Haleakala || NEAT || — || align=right | 2.4 km || 
|-id=354 bgcolor=#E9E9E9
| 72354 ||  || — || January 31, 2001 || Kitt Peak || Spacewatch || — || align=right | 2.7 km || 
|-id=355 bgcolor=#E9E9E9
| 72355 ||  || — || January 31, 2001 || Socorro || LINEAR || — || align=right | 4.1 km || 
|-id=356 bgcolor=#E9E9E9
| 72356 ||  || — || January 31, 2001 || Socorro || LINEAR || — || align=right | 2.7 km || 
|-id=357 bgcolor=#d6d6d6
| 72357 ||  || — || January 31, 2001 || Socorro || LINEAR || VER || align=right | 6.8 km || 
|-id=358 bgcolor=#E9E9E9
| 72358 ||  || — || January 26, 2001 || Socorro || LINEAR || — || align=right | 3.6 km || 
|-id=359 bgcolor=#d6d6d6
| 72359 ||  || — || January 26, 2001 || Socorro || LINEAR || — || align=right | 6.5 km || 
|-id=360 bgcolor=#d6d6d6
| 72360 ||  || — || January 26, 2001 || Socorro || LINEAR || ALA || align=right | 9.4 km || 
|-id=361 bgcolor=#d6d6d6
| 72361 ||  || — || January 25, 2001 || Kitt Peak || Spacewatch || EOS || align=right | 6.5 km || 
|-id=362 bgcolor=#E9E9E9
| 72362 ||  || — || January 22, 2001 || Haleakala || NEAT || HNS || align=right | 3.4 km || 
|-id=363 bgcolor=#fefefe
| 72363 ||  || — || January 21, 2001 || Socorro || LINEAR || NYS || align=right | 1.7 km || 
|-id=364 bgcolor=#fefefe
| 72364 ||  || — || January 21, 2001 || Socorro || LINEAR || V || align=right | 1.3 km || 
|-id=365 bgcolor=#E9E9E9
| 72365 ||  || — || January 21, 2001 || Socorro || LINEAR || — || align=right | 2.9 km || 
|-id=366 bgcolor=#fefefe
| 72366 || 2001 CO || — || February 1, 2001 || Socorro || LINEAR || — || align=right | 2.0 km || 
|-id=367 bgcolor=#E9E9E9
| 72367 ||  || — || February 1, 2001 || Socorro || LINEAR || — || align=right | 4.1 km || 
|-id=368 bgcolor=#E9E9E9
| 72368 ||  || — || February 1, 2001 || Socorro || LINEAR || — || align=right | 5.5 km || 
|-id=369 bgcolor=#d6d6d6
| 72369 ||  || — || February 1, 2001 || Socorro || LINEAR || — || align=right | 7.5 km || 
|-id=370 bgcolor=#d6d6d6
| 72370 ||  || — || February 1, 2001 || Socorro || LINEAR || — || align=right | 7.2 km || 
|-id=371 bgcolor=#fefefe
| 72371 ||  || — || February 1, 2001 || Socorro || LINEAR || NYS || align=right | 5.0 km || 
|-id=372 bgcolor=#fefefe
| 72372 ||  || — || February 1, 2001 || Socorro || LINEAR || — || align=right | 2.0 km || 
|-id=373 bgcolor=#fefefe
| 72373 ||  || — || February 1, 2001 || Socorro || LINEAR || — || align=right | 2.8 km || 
|-id=374 bgcolor=#E9E9E9
| 72374 ||  || — || February 1, 2001 || Socorro || LINEAR || — || align=right | 4.9 km || 
|-id=375 bgcolor=#fefefe
| 72375 ||  || — || February 1, 2001 || Socorro || LINEAR || FLO || align=right | 1.8 km || 
|-id=376 bgcolor=#d6d6d6
| 72376 ||  || — || February 1, 2001 || Socorro || LINEAR || EOS || align=right | 4.2 km || 
|-id=377 bgcolor=#fefefe
| 72377 ||  || — || February 1, 2001 || Socorro || LINEAR || NYS || align=right | 1.7 km || 
|-id=378 bgcolor=#E9E9E9
| 72378 ||  || — || February 1, 2001 || Socorro || LINEAR || — || align=right | 6.3 km || 
|-id=379 bgcolor=#E9E9E9
| 72379 ||  || — || February 1, 2001 || Socorro || LINEAR || MAR || align=right | 5.2 km || 
|-id=380 bgcolor=#E9E9E9
| 72380 ||  || — || February 1, 2001 || Socorro || LINEAR || — || align=right | 4.8 km || 
|-id=381 bgcolor=#d6d6d6
| 72381 ||  || — || February 1, 2001 || Socorro || LINEAR || — || align=right | 7.3 km || 
|-id=382 bgcolor=#fefefe
| 72382 ||  || — || February 1, 2001 || Socorro || LINEAR || FLO || align=right | 1.5 km || 
|-id=383 bgcolor=#fefefe
| 72383 ||  || — || February 1, 2001 || Socorro || LINEAR || V || align=right | 1.4 km || 
|-id=384 bgcolor=#fefefe
| 72384 ||  || — || February 1, 2001 || Socorro || LINEAR || ERI || align=right | 3.8 km || 
|-id=385 bgcolor=#E9E9E9
| 72385 ||  || — || February 1, 2001 || Socorro || LINEAR || — || align=right | 2.6 km || 
|-id=386 bgcolor=#fefefe
| 72386 ||  || — || February 1, 2001 || Socorro || LINEAR || — || align=right | 2.4 km || 
|-id=387 bgcolor=#fefefe
| 72387 ||  || — || February 1, 2001 || Socorro || LINEAR || — || align=right | 2.0 km || 
|-id=388 bgcolor=#E9E9E9
| 72388 ||  || — || February 1, 2001 || Socorro || LINEAR || — || align=right | 4.3 km || 
|-id=389 bgcolor=#E9E9E9
| 72389 ||  || — || February 1, 2001 || Socorro || LINEAR || MRX || align=right | 2.5 km || 
|-id=390 bgcolor=#fefefe
| 72390 ||  || — || February 1, 2001 || Socorro || LINEAR || — || align=right | 1.2 km || 
|-id=391 bgcolor=#E9E9E9
| 72391 ||  || — || February 1, 2001 || Socorro || LINEAR || — || align=right | 2.3 km || 
|-id=392 bgcolor=#E9E9E9
| 72392 ||  || — || February 1, 2001 || Socorro || LINEAR || — || align=right | 1.9 km || 
|-id=393 bgcolor=#fefefe
| 72393 ||  || — || February 2, 2001 || Socorro || LINEAR || — || align=right | 4.0 km || 
|-id=394 bgcolor=#E9E9E9
| 72394 ||  || — || February 2, 2001 || Socorro || LINEAR || — || align=right | 4.0 km || 
|-id=395 bgcolor=#E9E9E9
| 72395 ||  || — || February 3, 2001 || Socorro || LINEAR || GEF || align=right | 3.6 km || 
|-id=396 bgcolor=#fefefe
| 72396 ||  || — || February 4, 2001 || Socorro || LINEAR || PHO || align=right | 5.8 km || 
|-id=397 bgcolor=#fefefe
| 72397 ||  || — || February 1, 2001 || Anderson Mesa || LONEOS || NYS || align=right | 1.6 km || 
|-id=398 bgcolor=#E9E9E9
| 72398 ||  || — || February 1, 2001 || Anderson Mesa || LONEOS || — || align=right | 3.1 km || 
|-id=399 bgcolor=#fefefe
| 72399 ||  || — || February 1, 2001 || Anderson Mesa || LONEOS || NYS || align=right | 1.1 km || 
|-id=400 bgcolor=#E9E9E9
| 72400 ||  || — || February 1, 2001 || Anderson Mesa || LONEOS || — || align=right | 2.1 km || 
|}

72401–72500 

|-bgcolor=#fefefe
| 72401 ||  || — || February 1, 2001 || Anderson Mesa || LONEOS || — || align=right | 1.3 km || 
|-id=402 bgcolor=#E9E9E9
| 72402 ||  || — || February 1, 2001 || Socorro || LINEAR || AST || align=right | 4.6 km || 
|-id=403 bgcolor=#E9E9E9
| 72403 ||  || — || February 1, 2001 || Socorro || LINEAR || — || align=right | 2.2 km || 
|-id=404 bgcolor=#fefefe
| 72404 ||  || — || February 1, 2001 || Socorro || LINEAR || — || align=right | 1.9 km || 
|-id=405 bgcolor=#E9E9E9
| 72405 ||  || — || February 2, 2001 || Kitt Peak || Spacewatch || EUN || align=right | 3.3 km || 
|-id=406 bgcolor=#E9E9E9
| 72406 ||  || — || February 2, 2001 || Anderson Mesa || LONEOS || — || align=right | 2.8 km || 
|-id=407 bgcolor=#E9E9E9
| 72407 ||  || — || February 2, 2001 || Anderson Mesa || LONEOS || — || align=right | 4.5 km || 
|-id=408 bgcolor=#d6d6d6
| 72408 ||  || — || February 2, 2001 || Anderson Mesa || LONEOS || — || align=right | 9.2 km || 
|-id=409 bgcolor=#E9E9E9
| 72409 ||  || — || February 2, 2001 || Anderson Mesa || LONEOS || — || align=right | 3.4 km || 
|-id=410 bgcolor=#E9E9E9
| 72410 ||  || — || February 2, 2001 || Anderson Mesa || LONEOS || — || align=right | 4.2 km || 
|-id=411 bgcolor=#fefefe
| 72411 ||  || — || February 2, 2001 || Anderson Mesa || LONEOS || V || align=right | 1.6 km || 
|-id=412 bgcolor=#E9E9E9
| 72412 ||  || — || February 2, 2001 || Anderson Mesa || LONEOS || PAE || align=right | 5.3 km || 
|-id=413 bgcolor=#fefefe
| 72413 ||  || — || February 2, 2001 || Anderson Mesa || LONEOS || — || align=right | 2.1 km || 
|-id=414 bgcolor=#E9E9E9
| 72414 ||  || — || February 2, 2001 || Haleakala || NEAT || — || align=right | 3.7 km || 
|-id=415 bgcolor=#d6d6d6
| 72415 ||  || — || February 2, 2001 || Haleakala || NEAT || — || align=right | 6.1 km || 
|-id=416 bgcolor=#fefefe
| 72416 ||  || — || February 3, 2001 || Socorro || LINEAR || — || align=right | 2.1 km || 
|-id=417 bgcolor=#E9E9E9
| 72417 ||  || — || February 11, 2001 || Višnjan Observatory || K. Korlević || — || align=right | 4.3 km || 
|-id=418 bgcolor=#E9E9E9
| 72418 ||  || — || February 13, 2001 || Socorro || LINEAR || — || align=right | 5.9 km || 
|-id=419 bgcolor=#E9E9E9
| 72419 ||  || — || February 13, 2001 || Socorro || LINEAR || — || align=right | 3.2 km || 
|-id=420 bgcolor=#E9E9E9
| 72420 ||  || — || February 14, 2001 || Črni Vrh || Črni Vrh || — || align=right | 4.9 km || 
|-id=421 bgcolor=#fefefe
| 72421 ||  || — || February 15, 2001 || Oizumi || T. Kobayashi || — || align=right | 2.2 km || 
|-id=422 bgcolor=#d6d6d6
| 72422 ||  || — || February 15, 2001 || Socorro || LINEAR || ALA || align=right | 9.6 km || 
|-id=423 bgcolor=#fefefe
| 72423 ||  || — || February 13, 2001 || Socorro || LINEAR || V || align=right | 2.1 km || 
|-id=424 bgcolor=#fefefe
| 72424 ||  || — || February 13, 2001 || Socorro || LINEAR || — || align=right | 2.4 km || 
|-id=425 bgcolor=#E9E9E9
| 72425 ||  || — || February 13, 2001 || Socorro || LINEAR || ADE || align=right | 4.9 km || 
|-id=426 bgcolor=#E9E9E9
| 72426 ||  || — || February 13, 2001 || Socorro || LINEAR || — || align=right | 2.6 km || 
|-id=427 bgcolor=#E9E9E9
| 72427 ||  || — || February 15, 2001 || Socorro || LINEAR || EUN || align=right | 3.5 km || 
|-id=428 bgcolor=#E9E9E9
| 72428 ||  || — || February 15, 2001 || Socorro || LINEAR || — || align=right | 3.8 km || 
|-id=429 bgcolor=#E9E9E9
| 72429 ||  || — || February 15, 2001 || Črni Vrh || Črni Vrh || — || align=right | 4.7 km || 
|-id=430 bgcolor=#d6d6d6
| 72430 ||  || — || February 13, 2001 || Socorro || LINEAR || — || align=right | 9.1 km || 
|-id=431 bgcolor=#d6d6d6
| 72431 ||  || — || February 15, 2001 || Socorro || LINEAR || — || align=right | 5.9 km || 
|-id=432 bgcolor=#E9E9E9
| 72432 Kimrobinson ||  ||  || February 14, 2001 || Carbuncle Hill || D. P. Pray || — || align=right | 2.2 km || 
|-id=433 bgcolor=#fefefe
| 72433 ||  || — || February 13, 2001 || Socorro || LINEAR || — || align=right | 2.0 km || 
|-id=434 bgcolor=#E9E9E9
| 72434 ||  || — || February 13, 2001 || Socorro || LINEAR || — || align=right | 4.5 km || 
|-id=435 bgcolor=#E9E9E9
| 72435 ||  || — || February 15, 2001 || Socorro || LINEAR || KAZ || align=right | 4.0 km || 
|-id=436 bgcolor=#E9E9E9
| 72436 ||  || — || February 15, 2001 || Socorro || LINEAR || — || align=right | 3.6 km || 
|-id=437 bgcolor=#E9E9E9
| 72437 ||  || — || February 15, 2001 || Socorro || LINEAR || MAR || align=right | 3.0 km || 
|-id=438 bgcolor=#E9E9E9
| 72438 ||  || — || February 15, 2001 || Socorro || LINEAR || EUN || align=right | 2.3 km || 
|-id=439 bgcolor=#E9E9E9
| 72439 ||  || — || February 15, 2001 || Socorro || LINEAR || MAR || align=right | 4.0 km || 
|-id=440 bgcolor=#d6d6d6
| 72440 ||  || — || February 15, 2001 || Socorro || LINEAR || URS || align=right | 10 km || 
|-id=441 bgcolor=#E9E9E9
| 72441 ||  || — || February 13, 2001 || Kitt Peak || Spacewatch || — || align=right | 3.2 km || 
|-id=442 bgcolor=#fefefe
| 72442 ||  || — || February 12, 2001 || Anderson Mesa || LONEOS || FLO || align=right | 1.7 km || 
|-id=443 bgcolor=#fefefe
| 72443 ||  || — || February 12, 2001 || Anderson Mesa || LONEOS || NYS || align=right | 1.6 km || 
|-id=444 bgcolor=#E9E9E9
| 72444 ||  || — || February 15, 2001 || Socorro || LINEAR || — || align=right | 3.6 km || 
|-id=445 bgcolor=#E9E9E9
| 72445 || 2001 DD || — || February 16, 2001 || Črni Vrh || Črni Vrh || PAD || align=right | 4.7 km || 
|-id=446 bgcolor=#d6d6d6
| 72446 || 2001 DM || — || February 16, 2001 || Desert Beaver || W. K. Y. Yeung || — || align=right | 7.5 km || 
|-id=447 bgcolor=#d6d6d6
| 72447 Polińska || 2001 DP ||  || February 16, 2001 || Ondřejov || P. Pravec, L. Kotková || — || align=right | 5.6 km || 
|-id=448 bgcolor=#fefefe
| 72448 ||  || — || February 16, 2001 || Kitt Peak || Spacewatch || — || align=right | 3.6 km || 
|-id=449 bgcolor=#fefefe
| 72449 ||  || — || February 16, 2001 || Socorro || LINEAR || V || align=right | 1.5 km || 
|-id=450 bgcolor=#fefefe
| 72450 ||  || — || February 16, 2001 || Socorro || LINEAR || V || align=right | 2.0 km || 
|-id=451 bgcolor=#d6d6d6
| 72451 ||  || — || February 16, 2001 || Socorro || LINEAR || EOS || align=right | 5.1 km || 
|-id=452 bgcolor=#E9E9E9
| 72452 ||  || — || February 16, 2001 || Socorro || LINEAR || — || align=right | 6.3 km || 
|-id=453 bgcolor=#d6d6d6
| 72453 ||  || — || February 16, 2001 || Višnjan Observatory || K. Korlević || — || align=right | 11 km || 
|-id=454 bgcolor=#d6d6d6
| 72454 ||  || — || February 16, 2001 || Socorro || LINEAR || TIR || align=right | 5.3 km || 
|-id=455 bgcolor=#E9E9E9
| 72455 ||  || — || February 17, 2001 || Socorro || LINEAR || — || align=right | 2.3 km || 
|-id=456 bgcolor=#fefefe
| 72456 ||  || — || February 19, 2001 || Kitt Peak || Spacewatch || NYS || align=right | 1.4 km || 
|-id=457 bgcolor=#fefefe
| 72457 ||  || — || February 17, 2001 || Socorro || LINEAR || PHO || align=right | 2.1 km || 
|-id=458 bgcolor=#E9E9E9
| 72458 ||  || — || February 16, 2001 || Socorro || LINEAR || — || align=right | 5.2 km || 
|-id=459 bgcolor=#E9E9E9
| 72459 ||  || — || February 16, 2001 || Socorro || LINEAR || — || align=right | 4.2 km || 
|-id=460 bgcolor=#E9E9E9
| 72460 ||  || — || February 16, 2001 || Socorro || LINEAR || — || align=right | 3.6 km || 
|-id=461 bgcolor=#E9E9E9
| 72461 ||  || — || February 16, 2001 || Socorro || LINEAR || BRU || align=right | 5.0 km || 
|-id=462 bgcolor=#d6d6d6
| 72462 ||  || — || February 16, 2001 || Socorro || LINEAR || — || align=right | 10 km || 
|-id=463 bgcolor=#d6d6d6
| 72463 ||  || — || February 16, 2001 || Socorro || LINEAR || EOS || align=right | 5.9 km || 
|-id=464 bgcolor=#E9E9E9
| 72464 ||  || — || February 16, 2001 || Socorro || LINEAR || MAR || align=right | 3.4 km || 
|-id=465 bgcolor=#E9E9E9
| 72465 ||  || — || February 17, 2001 || Socorro || LINEAR || PAD || align=right | 4.9 km || 
|-id=466 bgcolor=#E9E9E9
| 72466 ||  || — || February 17, 2001 || Socorro || LINEAR || — || align=right | 3.4 km || 
|-id=467 bgcolor=#E9E9E9
| 72467 ||  || — || February 17, 2001 || Socorro || LINEAR || — || align=right | 2.4 km || 
|-id=468 bgcolor=#E9E9E9
| 72468 ||  || — || February 17, 2001 || Socorro || LINEAR || — || align=right | 3.8 km || 
|-id=469 bgcolor=#E9E9E9
| 72469 ||  || — || February 17, 2001 || Socorro || LINEAR || — || align=right | 2.7 km || 
|-id=470 bgcolor=#d6d6d6
| 72470 ||  || — || February 17, 2001 || Socorro || LINEAR || — || align=right | 7.0 km || 
|-id=471 bgcolor=#d6d6d6
| 72471 ||  || — || February 17, 2001 || Socorro || LINEAR || EOS || align=right | 4.7 km || 
|-id=472 bgcolor=#d6d6d6
| 72472 ||  || — || February 17, 2001 || Socorro || LINEAR || THM || align=right | 7.9 km || 
|-id=473 bgcolor=#E9E9E9
| 72473 ||  || — || February 17, 2001 || Socorro || LINEAR || — || align=right | 3.6 km || 
|-id=474 bgcolor=#fefefe
| 72474 ||  || — || February 19, 2001 || Socorro || LINEAR || — || align=right | 1.8 km || 
|-id=475 bgcolor=#E9E9E9
| 72475 ||  || — || February 19, 2001 || Socorro || LINEAR || — || align=right | 4.9 km || 
|-id=476 bgcolor=#d6d6d6
| 72476 ||  || — || February 19, 2001 || Socorro || LINEAR || — || align=right | 8.3 km || 
|-id=477 bgcolor=#E9E9E9
| 72477 ||  || — || February 19, 2001 || Socorro || LINEAR || EUN || align=right | 2.8 km || 
|-id=478 bgcolor=#E9E9E9
| 72478 ||  || — || February 19, 2001 || Socorro || LINEAR || INO || align=right | 3.5 km || 
|-id=479 bgcolor=#E9E9E9
| 72479 ||  || — || February 19, 2001 || Socorro || LINEAR || MAR || align=right | 2.4 km || 
|-id=480 bgcolor=#fefefe
| 72480 ||  || — || February 19, 2001 || Socorro || LINEAR || V || align=right | 1.8 km || 
|-id=481 bgcolor=#E9E9E9
| 72481 ||  || — || February 19, 2001 || Socorro || LINEAR || — || align=right | 2.3 km || 
|-id=482 bgcolor=#fefefe
| 72482 ||  || — || February 19, 2001 || Socorro || LINEAR || FLO || align=right | 1.8 km || 
|-id=483 bgcolor=#E9E9E9
| 72483 ||  || — || February 19, 2001 || Socorro || LINEAR || — || align=right | 2.8 km || 
|-id=484 bgcolor=#E9E9E9
| 72484 ||  || — || February 19, 2001 || Socorro || LINEAR || — || align=right | 1.9 km || 
|-id=485 bgcolor=#d6d6d6
| 72485 ||  || — || February 19, 2001 || Socorro || LINEAR || THM || align=right | 6.2 km || 
|-id=486 bgcolor=#fefefe
| 72486 ||  || — || February 19, 2001 || Socorro || LINEAR || — || align=right | 4.0 km || 
|-id=487 bgcolor=#E9E9E9
| 72487 ||  || — || February 19, 2001 || Socorro || LINEAR || — || align=right | 4.3 km || 
|-id=488 bgcolor=#fefefe
| 72488 ||  || — || February 19, 2001 || Socorro || LINEAR || MAS || align=right | 2.0 km || 
|-id=489 bgcolor=#E9E9E9
| 72489 ||  || — || February 19, 2001 || Socorro || LINEAR || — || align=right | 3.4 km || 
|-id=490 bgcolor=#fefefe
| 72490 ||  || — || February 19, 2001 || Socorro || LINEAR || — || align=right | 3.3 km || 
|-id=491 bgcolor=#E9E9E9
| 72491 ||  || — || February 16, 2001 || Socorro || LINEAR || — || align=right | 7.6 km || 
|-id=492 bgcolor=#E9E9E9
| 72492 ||  || — || February 21, 2001 || Desert Beaver || W. K. Y. Yeung || — || align=right | 2.9 km || 
|-id=493 bgcolor=#E9E9E9
| 72493 ||  || — || February 17, 2001 || Socorro || LINEAR || PAE || align=right | 7.4 km || 
|-id=494 bgcolor=#d6d6d6
| 72494 ||  || — || February 17, 2001 || Socorro || LINEAR || — || align=right | 9.8 km || 
|-id=495 bgcolor=#E9E9E9
| 72495 ||  || — || February 19, 2001 || Socorro || LINEAR || — || align=right | 5.2 km || 
|-id=496 bgcolor=#fefefe
| 72496 ||  || — || February 19, 2001 || Socorro || LINEAR || — || align=right | 1.7 km || 
|-id=497 bgcolor=#E9E9E9
| 72497 ||  || — || February 19, 2001 || Socorro || LINEAR || — || align=right | 2.5 km || 
|-id=498 bgcolor=#E9E9E9
| 72498 ||  || — || February 19, 2001 || Socorro || LINEAR || — || align=right | 5.7 km || 
|-id=499 bgcolor=#fefefe
| 72499 ||  || — || February 19, 2001 || Socorro || LINEAR || MAS || align=right | 1.9 km || 
|-id=500 bgcolor=#fefefe
| 72500 ||  || — || February 19, 2001 || Socorro || LINEAR || NYS || align=right | 1.7 km || 
|}

72501–72600 

|-bgcolor=#d6d6d6
| 72501 ||  || — || February 19, 2001 || Socorro || LINEAR || CHA || align=right | 7.0 km || 
|-id=502 bgcolor=#E9E9E9
| 72502 ||  || — || February 19, 2001 || Socorro || LINEAR || — || align=right | 3.5 km || 
|-id=503 bgcolor=#fefefe
| 72503 ||  || — || February 19, 2001 || Socorro || LINEAR || NYS || align=right | 1.8 km || 
|-id=504 bgcolor=#d6d6d6
| 72504 ||  || — || February 19, 2001 || Socorro || LINEAR || EOS || align=right | 4.9 km || 
|-id=505 bgcolor=#fefefe
| 72505 ||  || — || February 19, 2001 || Socorro || LINEAR || NYS || align=right | 1.4 km || 
|-id=506 bgcolor=#fefefe
| 72506 ||  || — || February 19, 2001 || Socorro || LINEAR || NYS || align=right | 1.9 km || 
|-id=507 bgcolor=#d6d6d6
| 72507 ||  || — || February 19, 2001 || Socorro || LINEAR || — || align=right | 5.8 km || 
|-id=508 bgcolor=#fefefe
| 72508 ||  || — || February 19, 2001 || Socorro || LINEAR || NYS || align=right | 1.6 km || 
|-id=509 bgcolor=#E9E9E9
| 72509 ||  || — || February 19, 2001 || Socorro || LINEAR || HEN || align=right | 2.7 km || 
|-id=510 bgcolor=#E9E9E9
| 72510 ||  || — || February 19, 2001 || Socorro || LINEAR || — || align=right | 3.1 km || 
|-id=511 bgcolor=#d6d6d6
| 72511 ||  || — || February 19, 2001 || Socorro || LINEAR || — || align=right | 7.2 km || 
|-id=512 bgcolor=#E9E9E9
| 72512 ||  || — || February 20, 2001 || Socorro || LINEAR || — || align=right | 4.2 km || 
|-id=513 bgcolor=#d6d6d6
| 72513 ||  || — || February 18, 2001 || Haleakala || NEAT || — || align=right | 12 km || 
|-id=514 bgcolor=#E9E9E9
| 72514 ||  || — || February 16, 2001 || Socorro || LINEAR || — || align=right | 7.1 km || 
|-id=515 bgcolor=#fefefe
| 72515 ||  || — || February 16, 2001 || Socorro || LINEAR || — || align=right | 2.1 km || 
|-id=516 bgcolor=#E9E9E9
| 72516 ||  || — || February 26, 2001 || Oizumi || T. Kobayashi || — || align=right | 6.6 km || 
|-id=517 bgcolor=#E9E9E9
| 72517 ||  || — || February 26, 2001 || Oizumi || T. Kobayashi || — || align=right | 5.9 km || 
|-id=518 bgcolor=#E9E9E9
| 72518 ||  || — || February 25, 2001 || Ondřejov || P. Kušnirák || — || align=right | 3.5 km || 
|-id=519 bgcolor=#fefefe
| 72519 ||  || — || February 21, 2001 || Anderson Mesa || LONEOS || — || align=right | 1.7 km || 
|-id=520 bgcolor=#d6d6d6
| 72520 ||  || — || February 24, 2001 || Prescott || P. G. Comba || EOS || align=right | 4.2 km || 
|-id=521 bgcolor=#E9E9E9
| 72521 ||  || — || February 27, 2001 || Kitt Peak || Spacewatch || PAD || align=right | 4.0 km || 
|-id=522 bgcolor=#E9E9E9
| 72522 ||  || — || February 22, 2001 || Socorro || LINEAR || — || align=right | 5.7 km || 
|-id=523 bgcolor=#E9E9E9
| 72523 ||  || — || February 20, 2001 || Haleakala || NEAT || — || align=right | 3.6 km || 
|-id=524 bgcolor=#E9E9E9
| 72524 ||  || — || February 20, 2001 || Haleakala || NEAT || — || align=right | 2.3 km || 
|-id=525 bgcolor=#d6d6d6
| 72525 ||  || — || February 19, 2001 || Anderson Mesa || LONEOS || EOS || align=right | 5.8 km || 
|-id=526 bgcolor=#fefefe
| 72526 ||  || — || February 19, 2001 || Anderson Mesa || LONEOS || — || align=right | 1.2 km || 
|-id=527 bgcolor=#fefefe
| 72527 ||  || — || February 19, 2001 || Socorro || LINEAR || V || align=right | 1.5 km || 
|-id=528 bgcolor=#E9E9E9
| 72528 ||  || — || February 18, 2001 || Haleakala || NEAT || EUN || align=right | 2.1 km || 
|-id=529 bgcolor=#fefefe
| 72529 ||  || — || February 17, 2001 || Socorro || LINEAR || — || align=right | 2.2 km || 
|-id=530 bgcolor=#E9E9E9
| 72530 ||  || — || February 17, 2001 || Socorro || LINEAR || — || align=right | 4.8 km || 
|-id=531 bgcolor=#d6d6d6
| 72531 ||  || — || February 17, 2001 || Socorro || LINEAR || — || align=right | 6.6 km || 
|-id=532 bgcolor=#fefefe
| 72532 ||  || — || February 17, 2001 || Socorro || LINEAR || NYS || align=right | 1.7 km || 
|-id=533 bgcolor=#E9E9E9
| 72533 ||  || — || February 17, 2001 || Socorro || LINEAR || — || align=right | 2.6 km || 
|-id=534 bgcolor=#E9E9E9
| 72534 ||  || — || February 17, 2001 || Haleakala || NEAT || — || align=right | 2.7 km || 
|-id=535 bgcolor=#fefefe
| 72535 ||  || — || February 16, 2001 || Socorro || LINEAR || — || align=right | 2.0 km || 
|-id=536 bgcolor=#E9E9E9
| 72536 ||  || — || February 16, 2001 || Socorro || LINEAR || — || align=right | 7.3 km || 
|-id=537 bgcolor=#fefefe
| 72537 ||  || — || February 16, 2001 || Socorro || LINEAR || — || align=right | 2.9 km || 
|-id=538 bgcolor=#fefefe
| 72538 ||  || — || February 16, 2001 || Socorro || LINEAR || FLO || align=right | 1.5 km || 
|-id=539 bgcolor=#E9E9E9
| 72539 ||  || — || February 16, 2001 || Anderson Mesa || LONEOS || — || align=right | 3.8 km || 
|-id=540 bgcolor=#d6d6d6
| 72540 ||  || — || February 16, 2001 || Anderson Mesa || LONEOS || THM || align=right | 5.1 km || 
|-id=541 bgcolor=#d6d6d6
| 72541 ||  || — || February 16, 2001 || Anderson Mesa || LONEOS || KOR || align=right | 3.1 km || 
|-id=542 bgcolor=#E9E9E9
| 72542 ||  || — || February 16, 2001 || Anderson Mesa || LONEOS || — || align=right | 1.8 km || 
|-id=543 bgcolor=#E9E9E9
| 72543 Simonemarchi ||  ||  || February 26, 2001 || Cima Ekar || ADAS || — || align=right | 2.2 km || 
|-id=544 bgcolor=#E9E9E9
| 72544 ||  || — || February 19, 2001 || Anderson Mesa || LONEOS || — || align=right | 1.7 km || 
|-id=545 bgcolor=#d6d6d6
| 72545 Robbiiwessen || 2001 EP ||  || March 3, 2001 || Farpoint || G. Hug || — || align=right | 5.7 km || 
|-id=546 bgcolor=#fefefe
| 72546 || 2001 ES || — || March 4, 2001 || Oaxaca || J. M. Roe || FLO || align=right | 1.9 km || 
|-id=547 bgcolor=#E9E9E9
| 72547 || 2001 ET || — || March 1, 2001 || Socorro || LINEAR || — || align=right | 2.9 km || 
|-id=548 bgcolor=#E9E9E9
| 72548 ||  || — || March 1, 2001 || Socorro || LINEAR || — || align=right | 2.5 km || 
|-id=549 bgcolor=#E9E9E9
| 72549 ||  || — || March 1, 2001 || Socorro || LINEAR || — || align=right | 2.4 km || 
|-id=550 bgcolor=#E9E9E9
| 72550 ||  || — || March 1, 2001 || Socorro || LINEAR || — || align=right | 5.5 km || 
|-id=551 bgcolor=#E9E9E9
| 72551 ||  || — || March 1, 2001 || Socorro || LINEAR || HNS || align=right | 3.6 km || 
|-id=552 bgcolor=#E9E9E9
| 72552 ||  || — || March 1, 2001 || Socorro || LINEAR || — || align=right | 5.1 km || 
|-id=553 bgcolor=#E9E9E9
| 72553 ||  || — || March 3, 2001 || Kitt Peak || Spacewatch || — || align=right | 3.1 km || 
|-id=554 bgcolor=#d6d6d6
| 72554 ||  || — || March 2, 2001 || Anderson Mesa || LONEOS || — || align=right | 7.6 km || 
|-id=555 bgcolor=#E9E9E9
| 72555 ||  || — || March 2, 2001 || Anderson Mesa || LONEOS || MRX || align=right | 2.2 km || 
|-id=556 bgcolor=#d6d6d6
| 72556 ||  || — || March 2, 2001 || Anderson Mesa || LONEOS || KOR || align=right | 3.6 km || 
|-id=557 bgcolor=#E9E9E9
| 72557 ||  || — || March 2, 2001 || Anderson Mesa || LONEOS || — || align=right | 5.6 km || 
|-id=558 bgcolor=#d6d6d6
| 72558 ||  || — || March 2, 2001 || Anderson Mesa || LONEOS || HYG || align=right | 6.3 km || 
|-id=559 bgcolor=#d6d6d6
| 72559 ||  || — || March 2, 2001 || Anderson Mesa || LONEOS || — || align=right | 4.7 km || 
|-id=560 bgcolor=#E9E9E9
| 72560 ||  || — || March 2, 2001 || Anderson Mesa || LONEOS || — || align=right | 5.1 km || 
|-id=561 bgcolor=#fefefe
| 72561 ||  || — || March 2, 2001 || Anderson Mesa || LONEOS || — || align=right | 1.9 km || 
|-id=562 bgcolor=#E9E9E9
| 72562 ||  || — || March 2, 2001 || Anderson Mesa || LONEOS || — || align=right | 3.1 km || 
|-id=563 bgcolor=#d6d6d6
| 72563 ||  || — || March 2, 2001 || Anderson Mesa || LONEOS || VER || align=right | 7.6 km || 
|-id=564 bgcolor=#E9E9E9
| 72564 ||  || — || March 2, 2001 || Anderson Mesa || LONEOS || — || align=right | 3.3 km || 
|-id=565 bgcolor=#E9E9E9
| 72565 ||  || — || March 2, 2001 || Anderson Mesa || LONEOS || HEN || align=right | 2.2 km || 
|-id=566 bgcolor=#E9E9E9
| 72566 ||  || — || March 2, 2001 || Anderson Mesa || LONEOS || — || align=right | 2.0 km || 
|-id=567 bgcolor=#d6d6d6
| 72567 ||  || — || March 2, 2001 || Haleakala || NEAT || — || align=right | 7.8 km || 
|-id=568 bgcolor=#fefefe
| 72568 ||  || — || March 5, 2001 || Socorro || LINEAR || — || align=right | 3.8 km || 
|-id=569 bgcolor=#FA8072
| 72569 ||  || — || March 14, 2001 || Socorro || LINEAR || PHO || align=right | 3.4 km || 
|-id=570 bgcolor=#E9E9E9
| 72570 ||  || — || March 15, 2001 || Socorro || LINEAR || — || align=right | 3.9 km || 
|-id=571 bgcolor=#d6d6d6
| 72571 ||  || — || March 15, 2001 || Socorro || LINEAR || — || align=right | 7.0 km || 
|-id=572 bgcolor=#d6d6d6
| 72572 ||  || — || March 15, 2001 || Socorro || LINEAR || EOS || align=right | 4.9 km || 
|-id=573 bgcolor=#d6d6d6
| 72573 ||  || — || March 15, 2001 || Haleakala || NEAT || EOS || align=right | 5.1 km || 
|-id=574 bgcolor=#E9E9E9
| 72574 ||  || — || March 15, 2001 || Haleakala || NEAT || — || align=right | 8.7 km || 
|-id=575 bgcolor=#fefefe
| 72575 ||  || — || March 15, 2001 || Haleakala || NEAT || NYS || align=right | 1.3 km || 
|-id=576 bgcolor=#E9E9E9
| 72576 ||  || — || March 14, 2001 || Anderson Mesa || LONEOS || MAR || align=right | 3.1 km || 
|-id=577 bgcolor=#E9E9E9
| 72577 ||  || — || March 14, 2001 || Anderson Mesa || LONEOS || — || align=right | 4.0 km || 
|-id=578 bgcolor=#E9E9E9
| 72578 ||  || — || March 14, 2001 || Anderson Mesa || LONEOS || — || align=right | 2.4 km || 
|-id=579 bgcolor=#d6d6d6
| 72579 ||  || — || March 15, 2001 || Kitt Peak || Spacewatch || — || align=right | 8.0 km || 
|-id=580 bgcolor=#fefefe
| 72580 ||  || — || March 15, 2001 || Anderson Mesa || LONEOS || V || align=right | 1.7 km || 
|-id=581 bgcolor=#E9E9E9
| 72581 ||  || — || March 15, 2001 || Anderson Mesa || LONEOS || — || align=right | 2.2 km || 
|-id=582 bgcolor=#d6d6d6
| 72582 ||  || — || March 15, 2001 || Anderson Mesa || LONEOS || THM || align=right | 5.0 km || 
|-id=583 bgcolor=#d6d6d6
| 72583 || 2001 FV || — || March 17, 2001 || Socorro || LINEAR || EOS || align=right | 4.1 km || 
|-id=584 bgcolor=#d6d6d6
| 72584 ||  || — || March 19, 2001 || Reedy Creek || J. Broughton || EOS || align=right | 4.5 km || 
|-id=585 bgcolor=#d6d6d6
| 72585 ||  || — || March 16, 2001 || Socorro || LINEAR || — || align=right | 7.7 km || 
|-id=586 bgcolor=#d6d6d6
| 72586 ||  || — || March 16, 2001 || Socorro || LINEAR || TEL || align=right | 4.1 km || 
|-id=587 bgcolor=#d6d6d6
| 72587 ||  || — || March 18, 2001 || Socorro || LINEAR || — || align=right | 5.1 km || 
|-id=588 bgcolor=#d6d6d6
| 72588 ||  || — || March 18, 2001 || Socorro || LINEAR || — || align=right | 5.3 km || 
|-id=589 bgcolor=#E9E9E9
| 72589 ||  || — || March 18, 2001 || Socorro || LINEAR || — || align=right | 2.9 km || 
|-id=590 bgcolor=#E9E9E9
| 72590 ||  || — || March 18, 2001 || Socorro || LINEAR || — || align=right | 5.0 km || 
|-id=591 bgcolor=#E9E9E9
| 72591 ||  || — || March 18, 2001 || Socorro || LINEAR || — || align=right | 5.0 km || 
|-id=592 bgcolor=#E9E9E9
| 72592 ||  || — || March 18, 2001 || Socorro || LINEAR || — || align=right | 3.8 km || 
|-id=593 bgcolor=#E9E9E9
| 72593 ||  || — || March 19, 2001 || Socorro || LINEAR || MAR || align=right | 2.9 km || 
|-id=594 bgcolor=#d6d6d6
| 72594 ||  || — || March 19, 2001 || Socorro || LINEAR || SYL7:4 || align=right | 13 km || 
|-id=595 bgcolor=#E9E9E9
| 72595 ||  || — || March 20, 2001 || Socorro || LINEAR || — || align=right | 3.1 km || 
|-id=596 bgcolor=#fefefe
| 72596 Zilkha ||  ||  || March 21, 2001 || Needville || J. Dellinger, K. Rivich || — || align=right | 2.8 km || 
|-id=597 bgcolor=#d6d6d6
| 72597 ||  || — || March 19, 2001 || Anderson Mesa || LONEOS || — || align=right | 6.0 km || 
|-id=598 bgcolor=#E9E9E9
| 72598 ||  || — || March 19, 2001 || Anderson Mesa || LONEOS || — || align=right | 2.7 km || 
|-id=599 bgcolor=#d6d6d6
| 72599 ||  || — || March 19, 2001 || Anderson Mesa || LONEOS || — || align=right | 6.6 km || 
|-id=600 bgcolor=#d6d6d6
| 72600 ||  || — || March 19, 2001 || Anderson Mesa || LONEOS || — || align=right | 4.3 km || 
|}

72601–72700 

|-bgcolor=#E9E9E9
| 72601 ||  || — || March 19, 2001 || Anderson Mesa || LONEOS || AST || align=right | 5.2 km || 
|-id=602 bgcolor=#d6d6d6
| 72602 ||  || — || March 19, 2001 || Anderson Mesa || LONEOS || HYG || align=right | 9.6 km || 
|-id=603 bgcolor=#d6d6d6
| 72603 ||  || — || March 19, 2001 || Anderson Mesa || LONEOS || — || align=right | 8.4 km || 
|-id=604 bgcolor=#d6d6d6
| 72604 ||  || — || March 19, 2001 || Anderson Mesa || LONEOS || — || align=right | 7.7 km || 
|-id=605 bgcolor=#d6d6d6
| 72605 ||  || — || March 19, 2001 || Anderson Mesa || LONEOS || — || align=right | 7.0 km || 
|-id=606 bgcolor=#d6d6d6
| 72606 ||  || — || March 19, 2001 || Anderson Mesa || LONEOS || — || align=right | 7.4 km || 
|-id=607 bgcolor=#d6d6d6
| 72607 ||  || — || March 19, 2001 || Anderson Mesa || LONEOS || KOR || align=right | 3.1 km || 
|-id=608 bgcolor=#d6d6d6
| 72608 ||  || — || March 19, 2001 || Anderson Mesa || LONEOS || — || align=right | 6.2 km || 
|-id=609 bgcolor=#d6d6d6
| 72609 ||  || — || March 19, 2001 || Anderson Mesa || LONEOS || — || align=right | 8.1 km || 
|-id=610 bgcolor=#E9E9E9
| 72610 ||  || — || March 19, 2001 || Anderson Mesa || LONEOS || — || align=right | 4.2 km || 
|-id=611 bgcolor=#d6d6d6
| 72611 ||  || — || March 19, 2001 || Anderson Mesa || LONEOS || 628 || align=right | 5.0 km || 
|-id=612 bgcolor=#E9E9E9
| 72612 ||  || — || March 19, 2001 || Anderson Mesa || LONEOS || WIT || align=right | 2.8 km || 
|-id=613 bgcolor=#E9E9E9
| 72613 ||  || — || March 19, 2001 || Anderson Mesa || LONEOS || NEM || align=right | 6.8 km || 
|-id=614 bgcolor=#d6d6d6
| 72614 ||  || — || March 19, 2001 || Anderson Mesa || LONEOS || EOS || align=right | 5.1 km || 
|-id=615 bgcolor=#E9E9E9
| 72615 ||  || — || March 21, 2001 || Anderson Mesa || LONEOS || EUN || align=right | 5.5 km || 
|-id=616 bgcolor=#d6d6d6
| 72616 ||  || — || March 21, 2001 || Anderson Mesa || LONEOS || HYG || align=right | 8.0 km || 
|-id=617 bgcolor=#d6d6d6
| 72617 ||  || — || March 21, 2001 || Anderson Mesa || LONEOS || — || align=right | 6.4 km || 
|-id=618 bgcolor=#E9E9E9
| 72618 ||  || — || March 21, 2001 || Anderson Mesa || LONEOS || GEF || align=right | 3.0 km || 
|-id=619 bgcolor=#E9E9E9
| 72619 ||  || — || March 21, 2001 || Anderson Mesa || LONEOS || — || align=right | 3.1 km || 
|-id=620 bgcolor=#E9E9E9
| 72620 ||  || — || March 18, 2001 || Socorro || LINEAR || — || align=right | 3.5 km || 
|-id=621 bgcolor=#E9E9E9
| 72621 ||  || — || March 18, 2001 || Socorro || LINEAR || — || align=right | 5.7 km || 
|-id=622 bgcolor=#d6d6d6
| 72622 ||  || — || March 18, 2001 || Socorro || LINEAR || HYG || align=right | 8.3 km || 
|-id=623 bgcolor=#d6d6d6
| 72623 ||  || — || March 18, 2001 || Socorro || LINEAR || — || align=right | 8.5 km || 
|-id=624 bgcolor=#E9E9E9
| 72624 ||  || — || March 18, 2001 || Socorro || LINEAR || — || align=right | 5.5 km || 
|-id=625 bgcolor=#d6d6d6
| 72625 ||  || — || March 18, 2001 || Socorro || LINEAR || — || align=right | 4.7 km || 
|-id=626 bgcolor=#E9E9E9
| 72626 ||  || — || March 18, 2001 || Socorro || LINEAR || AGN || align=right | 3.5 km || 
|-id=627 bgcolor=#d6d6d6
| 72627 ||  || — || March 19, 2001 || Socorro || LINEAR || VER || align=right | 6.9 km || 
|-id=628 bgcolor=#E9E9E9
| 72628 ||  || — || March 18, 2001 || Haleakala || NEAT || — || align=right | 2.6 km || 
|-id=629 bgcolor=#d6d6d6
| 72629 ||  || — || March 20, 2001 || Haleakala || NEAT || — || align=right | 8.3 km || 
|-id=630 bgcolor=#E9E9E9
| 72630 ||  || — || March 21, 2001 || Haleakala || NEAT || — || align=right | 2.2 km || 
|-id=631 bgcolor=#d6d6d6
| 72631 ||  || — || March 21, 2001 || Haleakala || NEAT || — || align=right | 8.0 km || 
|-id=632 bgcolor=#d6d6d6
| 72632 Coralina ||  ||  || March 23, 2001 || Gnosca || S. Sposetti || HYG || align=right | 7.1 km || 
|-id=633 bgcolor=#E9E9E9
| 72633 Randygroth ||  ||  || March 22, 2001 || Junk Bond || D. Healy || HEN || align=right | 2.8 km || 
|-id=634 bgcolor=#E9E9E9
| 72634 ||  || — || March 17, 2001 || Socorro || LINEAR || — || align=right | 3.3 km || 
|-id=635 bgcolor=#d6d6d6
| 72635 ||  || — || March 18, 2001 || Socorro || LINEAR || — || align=right | 5.2 km || 
|-id=636 bgcolor=#E9E9E9
| 72636 ||  || — || March 18, 2001 || Socorro || LINEAR || — || align=right | 1.8 km || 
|-id=637 bgcolor=#E9E9E9
| 72637 ||  || — || March 18, 2001 || Socorro || LINEAR || — || align=right | 5.6 km || 
|-id=638 bgcolor=#E9E9E9
| 72638 ||  || — || March 18, 2001 || Socorro || LINEAR || — || align=right | 2.3 km || 
|-id=639 bgcolor=#E9E9E9
| 72639 ||  || — || March 18, 2001 || Socorro || LINEAR || — || align=right | 3.9 km || 
|-id=640 bgcolor=#d6d6d6
| 72640 ||  || — || March 18, 2001 || Socorro || LINEAR || EOS || align=right | 4.4 km || 
|-id=641 bgcolor=#E9E9E9
| 72641 ||  || — || March 18, 2001 || Socorro || LINEAR || — || align=right | 2.7 km || 
|-id=642 bgcolor=#E9E9E9
| 72642 ||  || — || March 18, 2001 || Socorro || LINEAR || — || align=right | 5.2 km || 
|-id=643 bgcolor=#d6d6d6
| 72643 ||  || — || March 18, 2001 || Socorro || LINEAR || — || align=right | 11 km || 
|-id=644 bgcolor=#d6d6d6
| 72644 ||  || — || March 18, 2001 || Socorro || LINEAR || 629 || align=right | 3.4 km || 
|-id=645 bgcolor=#d6d6d6
| 72645 ||  || — || March 18, 2001 || Socorro || LINEAR || — || align=right | 12 km || 
|-id=646 bgcolor=#E9E9E9
| 72646 ||  || — || March 18, 2001 || Socorro || LINEAR || — || align=right | 3.3 km || 
|-id=647 bgcolor=#d6d6d6
| 72647 ||  || — || March 18, 2001 || Socorro || LINEAR || — || align=right | 7.2 km || 
|-id=648 bgcolor=#E9E9E9
| 72648 ||  || — || March 18, 2001 || Socorro || LINEAR || WIT || align=right | 2.6 km || 
|-id=649 bgcolor=#E9E9E9
| 72649 ||  || — || March 18, 2001 || Socorro || LINEAR || MIT || align=right | 3.9 km || 
|-id=650 bgcolor=#fefefe
| 72650 ||  || — || March 18, 2001 || Socorro || LINEAR || — || align=right | 3.7 km || 
|-id=651 bgcolor=#d6d6d6
| 72651 ||  || — || March 18, 2001 || Socorro || LINEAR || — || align=right | 8.5 km || 
|-id=652 bgcolor=#E9E9E9
| 72652 ||  || — || March 18, 2001 || Socorro || LINEAR || — || align=right | 2.6 km || 
|-id=653 bgcolor=#d6d6d6
| 72653 ||  || — || March 18, 2001 || Socorro || LINEAR || KOR || align=right | 3.6 km || 
|-id=654 bgcolor=#E9E9E9
| 72654 ||  || — || March 18, 2001 || Socorro || LINEAR || — || align=right | 3.4 km || 
|-id=655 bgcolor=#d6d6d6
| 72655 ||  || — || March 18, 2001 || Socorro || LINEAR || EOS || align=right | 9.9 km || 
|-id=656 bgcolor=#E9E9E9
| 72656 ||  || — || March 18, 2001 || Socorro || LINEAR || — || align=right | 2.2 km || 
|-id=657 bgcolor=#d6d6d6
| 72657 ||  || — || March 18, 2001 || Socorro || LINEAR || — || align=right | 6.9 km || 
|-id=658 bgcolor=#d6d6d6
| 72658 ||  || — || March 18, 2001 || Socorro || LINEAR || — || align=right | 4.5 km || 
|-id=659 bgcolor=#d6d6d6
| 72659 ||  || — || March 18, 2001 || Socorro || LINEAR || — || align=right | 9.0 km || 
|-id=660 bgcolor=#d6d6d6
| 72660 ||  || — || March 18, 2001 || Socorro || LINEAR || EOS || align=right | 6.9 km || 
|-id=661 bgcolor=#d6d6d6
| 72661 ||  || — || March 18, 2001 || Socorro || LINEAR || — || align=right | 7.2 km || 
|-id=662 bgcolor=#d6d6d6
| 72662 ||  || — || March 18, 2001 || Socorro || LINEAR || — || align=right | 11 km || 
|-id=663 bgcolor=#d6d6d6
| 72663 ||  || — || March 18, 2001 || Socorro || LINEAR || — || align=right | 6.3 km || 
|-id=664 bgcolor=#d6d6d6
| 72664 ||  || — || March 18, 2001 || Socorro || LINEAR || — || align=right | 8.5 km || 
|-id=665 bgcolor=#d6d6d6
| 72665 ||  || — || March 18, 2001 || Socorro || LINEAR || — || align=right | 8.7 km || 
|-id=666 bgcolor=#d6d6d6
| 72666 ||  || — || March 18, 2001 || Socorro || LINEAR || HYG || align=right | 7.3 km || 
|-id=667 bgcolor=#d6d6d6
| 72667 ||  || — || March 18, 2001 || Socorro || LINEAR || — || align=right | 13 km || 
|-id=668 bgcolor=#d6d6d6
| 72668 ||  || — || March 18, 2001 || Socorro || LINEAR || KOR || align=right | 3.5 km || 
|-id=669 bgcolor=#d6d6d6
| 72669 ||  || — || March 18, 2001 || Socorro || LINEAR || URS || align=right | 8.0 km || 
|-id=670 bgcolor=#d6d6d6
| 72670 ||  || — || March 18, 2001 || Socorro || LINEAR || — || align=right | 6.1 km || 
|-id=671 bgcolor=#E9E9E9
| 72671 ||  || — || March 18, 2001 || Socorro || LINEAR || — || align=right | 2.3 km || 
|-id=672 bgcolor=#d6d6d6
| 72672 ||  || — || March 18, 2001 || Socorro || LINEAR || — || align=right | 6.6 km || 
|-id=673 bgcolor=#d6d6d6
| 72673 ||  || — || March 18, 2001 || Socorro || LINEAR || — || align=right | 7.2 km || 
|-id=674 bgcolor=#E9E9E9
| 72674 ||  || — || March 18, 2001 || Socorro || LINEAR || MAR || align=right | 4.5 km || 
|-id=675 bgcolor=#E9E9E9
| 72675 ||  || — || March 18, 2001 || Socorro || LINEAR || — || align=right | 3.8 km || 
|-id=676 bgcolor=#d6d6d6
| 72676 ||  || — || March 23, 2001 || Socorro || LINEAR || — || align=right | 4.6 km || 
|-id=677 bgcolor=#fefefe
| 72677 ||  || — || March 19, 2001 || Socorro || LINEAR || MAS || align=right | 1.5 km || 
|-id=678 bgcolor=#d6d6d6
| 72678 ||  || — || March 19, 2001 || Socorro || LINEAR || EOS || align=right | 5.0 km || 
|-id=679 bgcolor=#E9E9E9
| 72679 ||  || — || March 19, 2001 || Socorro || LINEAR || — || align=right | 3.0 km || 
|-id=680 bgcolor=#d6d6d6
| 72680 ||  || — || March 19, 2001 || Socorro || LINEAR || — || align=right | 5.5 km || 
|-id=681 bgcolor=#E9E9E9
| 72681 ||  || — || March 19, 2001 || Socorro || LINEAR || — || align=right | 4.5 km || 
|-id=682 bgcolor=#d6d6d6
| 72682 ||  || — || March 19, 2001 || Socorro || LINEAR || HYG || align=right | 8.6 km || 
|-id=683 bgcolor=#E9E9E9
| 72683 ||  || — || March 19, 2001 || Socorro || LINEAR || — || align=right | 4.3 km || 
|-id=684 bgcolor=#d6d6d6
| 72684 ||  || — || March 19, 2001 || Socorro || LINEAR || KOR || align=right | 3.9 km || 
|-id=685 bgcolor=#E9E9E9
| 72685 ||  || — || March 19, 2001 || Socorro || LINEAR || MAR || align=right | 4.9 km || 
|-id=686 bgcolor=#d6d6d6
| 72686 ||  || — || March 19, 2001 || Socorro || LINEAR || — || align=right | 6.5 km || 
|-id=687 bgcolor=#E9E9E9
| 72687 ||  || — || March 19, 2001 || Socorro || LINEAR || — || align=right | 6.1 km || 
|-id=688 bgcolor=#d6d6d6
| 72688 ||  || — || March 19, 2001 || Socorro || LINEAR || — || align=right | 9.4 km || 
|-id=689 bgcolor=#d6d6d6
| 72689 ||  || — || March 19, 2001 || Socorro || LINEAR || ANF || align=right | 3.7 km || 
|-id=690 bgcolor=#d6d6d6
| 72690 ||  || — || March 19, 2001 || Socorro || LINEAR || — || align=right | 5.9 km || 
|-id=691 bgcolor=#d6d6d6
| 72691 ||  || — || March 19, 2001 || Socorro || LINEAR || — || align=right | 5.9 km || 
|-id=692 bgcolor=#d6d6d6
| 72692 ||  || — || March 19, 2001 || Socorro || LINEAR || HYG || align=right | 5.1 km || 
|-id=693 bgcolor=#E9E9E9
| 72693 ||  || — || March 19, 2001 || Socorro || LINEAR || GEF || align=right | 3.3 km || 
|-id=694 bgcolor=#d6d6d6
| 72694 ||  || — || March 19, 2001 || Socorro || LINEAR || — || align=right | 8.8 km || 
|-id=695 bgcolor=#d6d6d6
| 72695 ||  || — || March 19, 2001 || Socorro || LINEAR || — || align=right | 4.7 km || 
|-id=696 bgcolor=#d6d6d6
| 72696 ||  || — || March 19, 2001 || Socorro || LINEAR || EOS || align=right | 4.1 km || 
|-id=697 bgcolor=#d6d6d6
| 72697 ||  || — || March 19, 2001 || Socorro || LINEAR || — || align=right | 4.9 km || 
|-id=698 bgcolor=#d6d6d6
| 72698 ||  || — || March 19, 2001 || Socorro || LINEAR || EOS || align=right | 6.7 km || 
|-id=699 bgcolor=#E9E9E9
| 72699 ||  || — || March 19, 2001 || Socorro || LINEAR || — || align=right | 3.3 km || 
|-id=700 bgcolor=#E9E9E9
| 72700 ||  || — || March 19, 2001 || Socorro || LINEAR || — || align=right | 4.8 km || 
|}

72701–72800 

|-bgcolor=#d6d6d6
| 72701 ||  || — || March 19, 2001 || Socorro || LINEAR || — || align=right | 7.5 km || 
|-id=702 bgcolor=#d6d6d6
| 72702 ||  || — || March 19, 2001 || Socorro || LINEAR || — || align=right | 8.3 km || 
|-id=703 bgcolor=#d6d6d6
| 72703 ||  || — || March 21, 2001 || Socorro || LINEAR || — || align=right | 6.3 km || 
|-id=704 bgcolor=#E9E9E9
| 72704 ||  || — || March 21, 2001 || Socorro || LINEAR || — || align=right | 2.5 km || 
|-id=705 bgcolor=#d6d6d6
| 72705 ||  || — || March 21, 2001 || Socorro || LINEAR || — || align=right | 4.0 km || 
|-id=706 bgcolor=#d6d6d6
| 72706 ||  || — || March 21, 2001 || Socorro || LINEAR || — || align=right | 6.9 km || 
|-id=707 bgcolor=#E9E9E9
| 72707 ||  || — || March 23, 2001 || Socorro || LINEAR || AGN || align=right | 3.2 km || 
|-id=708 bgcolor=#d6d6d6
| 72708 ||  || — || March 23, 2001 || Socorro || LINEAR || — || align=right | 3.8 km || 
|-id=709 bgcolor=#E9E9E9
| 72709 ||  || — || March 23, 2001 || Socorro || LINEAR || — || align=right | 3.1 km || 
|-id=710 bgcolor=#d6d6d6
| 72710 ||  || — || March 23, 2001 || Socorro || LINEAR || — || align=right | 5.6 km || 
|-id=711 bgcolor=#d6d6d6
| 72711 ||  || — || March 23, 2001 || Socorro || LINEAR || — || align=right | 6.5 km || 
|-id=712 bgcolor=#d6d6d6
| 72712 ||  || — || March 26, 2001 || Kitt Peak || Spacewatch || — || align=right | 5.3 km || 
|-id=713 bgcolor=#E9E9E9
| 72713 ||  || — || March 21, 2001 || Anderson Mesa || LONEOS || — || align=right | 2.8 km || 
|-id=714 bgcolor=#d6d6d6
| 72714 ||  || — || March 21, 2001 || Anderson Mesa || LONEOS || EOS || align=right | 5.1 km || 
|-id=715 bgcolor=#d6d6d6
| 72715 ||  || — || March 21, 2001 || Anderson Mesa || LONEOS || EOS || align=right | 5.2 km || 
|-id=716 bgcolor=#d6d6d6
| 72716 ||  || — || March 21, 2001 || Anderson Mesa || LONEOS || — || align=right | 5.2 km || 
|-id=717 bgcolor=#d6d6d6
| 72717 ||  || — || March 21, 2001 || Anderson Mesa || LONEOS || — || align=right | 3.8 km || 
|-id=718 bgcolor=#d6d6d6
| 72718 ||  || — || March 24, 2001 || Socorro || LINEAR || ANF || align=right | 4.2 km || 
|-id=719 bgcolor=#d6d6d6
| 72719 ||  || — || March 26, 2001 || Socorro || LINEAR || KOR || align=right | 3.5 km || 
|-id=720 bgcolor=#fefefe
| 72720 ||  || — || March 26, 2001 || Socorro || LINEAR || — || align=right | 2.9 km || 
|-id=721 bgcolor=#E9E9E9
| 72721 ||  || — || March 16, 2001 || Socorro || LINEAR || — || align=right | 4.9 km || 
|-id=722 bgcolor=#E9E9E9
| 72722 ||  || — || March 16, 2001 || Socorro || LINEAR || — || align=right | 6.1 km || 
|-id=723 bgcolor=#E9E9E9
| 72723 ||  || — || March 16, 2001 || Socorro || LINEAR || — || align=right | 2.6 km || 
|-id=724 bgcolor=#d6d6d6
| 72724 ||  || — || March 16, 2001 || Socorro || LINEAR || — || align=right | 9.4 km || 
|-id=725 bgcolor=#d6d6d6
| 72725 ||  || — || March 16, 2001 || Socorro || LINEAR || HYG || align=right | 6.7 km || 
|-id=726 bgcolor=#d6d6d6
| 72726 ||  || — || March 16, 2001 || Socorro || LINEAR || — || align=right | 10 km || 
|-id=727 bgcolor=#d6d6d6
| 72727 ||  || — || March 16, 2001 || Socorro || LINEAR || — || align=right | 13 km || 
|-id=728 bgcolor=#d6d6d6
| 72728 ||  || — || March 16, 2001 || Socorro || LINEAR || NAE || align=right | 7.8 km || 
|-id=729 bgcolor=#d6d6d6
| 72729 ||  || — || March 16, 2001 || Socorro || LINEAR || — || align=right | 5.3 km || 
|-id=730 bgcolor=#d6d6d6
| 72730 ||  || — || March 16, 2001 || Socorro || LINEAR || — || align=right | 3.5 km || 
|-id=731 bgcolor=#E9E9E9
| 72731 ||  || — || March 17, 2001 || Socorro || LINEAR || — || align=right | 3.7 km || 
|-id=732 bgcolor=#fefefe
| 72732 ||  || — || March 17, 2001 || Socorro || LINEAR || V || align=right | 1.9 km || 
|-id=733 bgcolor=#E9E9E9
| 72733 ||  || — || March 17, 2001 || Socorro || LINEAR || — || align=right | 5.5 km || 
|-id=734 bgcolor=#d6d6d6
| 72734 ||  || — || March 17, 2001 || Socorro || LINEAR || EOS || align=right | 6.1 km || 
|-id=735 bgcolor=#d6d6d6
| 72735 ||  || — || March 17, 2001 || Kitt Peak || Spacewatch || HYG || align=right | 6.6 km || 
|-id=736 bgcolor=#d6d6d6
| 72736 ||  || — || March 18, 2001 || Socorro || LINEAR || — || align=right | 4.2 km || 
|-id=737 bgcolor=#E9E9E9
| 72737 ||  || — || March 18, 2001 || Socorro || LINEAR || — || align=right | 2.5 km || 
|-id=738 bgcolor=#E9E9E9
| 72738 ||  || — || March 18, 2001 || Socorro || LINEAR || — || align=right | 4.4 km || 
|-id=739 bgcolor=#d6d6d6
| 72739 ||  || — || March 18, 2001 || Anderson Mesa || LONEOS || — || align=right | 7.0 km || 
|-id=740 bgcolor=#d6d6d6
| 72740 ||  || — || March 18, 2001 || Anderson Mesa || LONEOS || — || align=right | 10 km || 
|-id=741 bgcolor=#E9E9E9
| 72741 ||  || — || March 18, 2001 || Anderson Mesa || LONEOS || — || align=right | 4.2 km || 
|-id=742 bgcolor=#d6d6d6
| 72742 ||  || — || March 18, 2001 || Socorro || LINEAR || — || align=right | 10 km || 
|-id=743 bgcolor=#d6d6d6
| 72743 ||  || — || March 19, 2001 || Socorro || LINEAR || — || align=right | 3.4 km || 
|-id=744 bgcolor=#E9E9E9
| 72744 ||  || — || March 19, 2001 || Anderson Mesa || LONEOS || MAR || align=right | 2.4 km || 
|-id=745 bgcolor=#E9E9E9
| 72745 ||  || — || March 19, 2001 || Haleakala || NEAT || EUN || align=right | 3.0 km || 
|-id=746 bgcolor=#E9E9E9
| 72746 ||  || — || March 26, 2001 || [Socorro || LINEAR || NEM || align=right | 3.7 km || 
|-id=747 bgcolor=#d6d6d6
| 72747 ||  || — || March 24, 2001 || Haleakala || NEAT || — || align=right | 10 km || 
|-id=748 bgcolor=#d6d6d6
| 72748 ||  || — || March 26, 2001 || Socorro || LINEAR || — || align=right | 4.9 km || 
|-id=749 bgcolor=#d6d6d6
| 72749 ||  || — || March 26, 2001 || Socorro || LINEAR || ALA || align=right | 8.5 km || 
|-id=750 bgcolor=#d6d6d6
| 72750 ||  || — || March 29, 2001 || Socorro || LINEAR || VER || align=right | 7.6 km || 
|-id=751 bgcolor=#E9E9E9
| 72751 ||  || — || March 26, 2001 || Socorro || LINEAR || — || align=right | 4.8 km || 
|-id=752 bgcolor=#d6d6d6
| 72752 ||  || — || March 28, 2001 || Socorro || LINEAR || EOS || align=right | 4.7 km || 
|-id=753 bgcolor=#fefefe
| 72753 ||  || — || March 29, 2001 || Socorro || LINEAR || — || align=right | 1.7 km || 
|-id=754 bgcolor=#E9E9E9
| 72754 ||  || — || March 20, 2001 || Haleakala || NEAT || HEN || align=right | 2.0 km || 
|-id=755 bgcolor=#E9E9E9
| 72755 ||  || — || March 20, 2001 || Haleakala || NEAT || — || align=right | 3.1 km || 
|-id=756 bgcolor=#d6d6d6
| 72756 ||  || — || March 21, 2001 || Anderson Mesa || LONEOS || — || align=right | 8.7 km || 
|-id=757 bgcolor=#E9E9E9
| 72757 ||  || — || March 21, 2001 || Haleakala || NEAT || MAR || align=right | 2.6 km || 
|-id=758 bgcolor=#E9E9E9
| 72758 ||  || — || March 21, 2001 || Anderson Mesa || LONEOS || — || align=right | 3.9 km || 
|-id=759 bgcolor=#E9E9E9
| 72759 ||  || — || March 21, 2001 || Haleakala || NEAT || — || align=right | 3.4 km || 
|-id=760 bgcolor=#E9E9E9
| 72760 ||  || — || March 21, 2001 || Haleakala || NEAT || — || align=right | 7.8 km || 
|-id=761 bgcolor=#d6d6d6
| 72761 ||  || — || March 23, 2001 || Haleakala || NEAT || URS || align=right | 6.7 km || 
|-id=762 bgcolor=#d6d6d6
| 72762 ||  || — || March 23, 2001 || Socorro || LINEAR || — || align=right | 6.5 km || 
|-id=763 bgcolor=#d6d6d6
| 72763 ||  || — || March 23, 2001 || Anderson Mesa || LONEOS || HYG || align=right | 11 km || 
|-id=764 bgcolor=#E9E9E9
| 72764 ||  || — || March 23, 2001 || Anderson Mesa || LONEOS || — || align=right | 6.7 km || 
|-id=765 bgcolor=#E9E9E9
| 72765 ||  || — || March 23, 2001 || Anderson Mesa || LONEOS || — || align=right | 3.7 km || 
|-id=766 bgcolor=#d6d6d6
| 72766 ||  || — || March 23, 2001 || Anderson Mesa || LONEOS || — || align=right | 4.7 km || 
|-id=767 bgcolor=#E9E9E9
| 72767 ||  || — || March 24, 2001 || Kitt Peak || Spacewatch || WIT || align=right | 2.4 km || 
|-id=768 bgcolor=#E9E9E9
| 72768 ||  || — || March 24, 2001 || Anderson Mesa || LONEOS || — || align=right | 3.4 km || 
|-id=769 bgcolor=#d6d6d6
| 72769 ||  || — || March 24, 2001 || Anderson Mesa || LONEOS || — || align=right | 4.5 km || 
|-id=770 bgcolor=#d6d6d6
| 72770 ||  || — || March 24, 2001 || Anderson Mesa || LONEOS || EOS || align=right | 8.3 km || 
|-id=771 bgcolor=#d6d6d6
| 72771 ||  || — || March 24, 2001 || Socorro || LINEAR || — || align=right | 4.5 km || 
|-id=772 bgcolor=#d6d6d6
| 72772 ||  || — || March 24, 2001 || Anderson Mesa || LONEOS || EOS || align=right | 4.1 km || 
|-id=773 bgcolor=#d6d6d6
| 72773 ||  || — || March 24, 2001 || Anderson Mesa || LONEOS || TIR || align=right | 4.8 km || 
|-id=774 bgcolor=#d6d6d6
| 72774 ||  || — || March 24, 2001 || Socorro || LINEAR || — || align=right | 6.8 km || 
|-id=775 bgcolor=#E9E9E9
| 72775 ||  || — || March 26, 2001 || Socorro || LINEAR || MAR || align=right | 3.3 km || 
|-id=776 bgcolor=#d6d6d6
| 72776 ||  || — || March 26, 2001 || Socorro || LINEAR || HYG || align=right | 7.0 km || 
|-id=777 bgcolor=#E9E9E9
| 72777 ||  || — || March 26, 2001 || Socorro || LINEAR || — || align=right | 4.8 km || 
|-id=778 bgcolor=#d6d6d6
| 72778 ||  || — || March 27, 2001 || Anderson Mesa || LONEOS || — || align=right | 5.3 km || 
|-id=779 bgcolor=#E9E9E9
| 72779 ||  || — || March 29, 2001 || Anderson Mesa || LONEOS || — || align=right | 2.4 km || 
|-id=780 bgcolor=#E9E9E9
| 72780 ||  || — || March 18, 2001 || Anderson Mesa || LONEOS || MAR || align=right | 2.2 km || 
|-id=781 bgcolor=#d6d6d6
| 72781 ||  || — || March 19, 2001 || Anderson Mesa || LONEOS || THM || align=right | 3.6 km || 
|-id=782 bgcolor=#d6d6d6
| 72782 ||  || — || March 19, 2001 || Socorro || LINEAR || — || align=right | 3.5 km || 
|-id=783 bgcolor=#d6d6d6
| 72783 ||  || — || March 23, 2001 || Anderson Mesa || LONEOS || — || align=right | 8.2 km || 
|-id=784 bgcolor=#E9E9E9
| 72784 ||  || — || March 24, 2001 || Anderson Mesa || LONEOS || — || align=right | 4.2 km || 
|-id=785 bgcolor=#d6d6d6
| 72785 ||  || — || March 24, 2001 || Anderson Mesa || LONEOS || — || align=right | 7.4 km || 
|-id=786 bgcolor=#E9E9E9
| 72786 ||  || — || March 24, 2001 || Anderson Mesa || LONEOS || — || align=right | 6.3 km || 
|-id=787 bgcolor=#d6d6d6
| 72787 ||  || — || March 24, 2001 || Anderson Mesa || LONEOS || — || align=right | 7.5 km || 
|-id=788 bgcolor=#d6d6d6
| 72788 ||  || — || March 24, 2001 || Haleakala || NEAT || — || align=right | 11 km || 
|-id=789 bgcolor=#E9E9E9
| 72789 ||  || — || March 21, 2001 || Kitt Peak || Spacewatch || MRX || align=right | 2.1 km || 
|-id=790 bgcolor=#d6d6d6
| 72790 ||  || — || March 16, 2001 || Socorro || LINEAR || EOS || align=right | 4.9 km || 
|-id=791 bgcolor=#d6d6d6
| 72791 ||  || — || March 16, 2001 || Socorro || LINEAR || EOS || align=right | 4.2 km || 
|-id=792 bgcolor=#d6d6d6
| 72792 ||  || — || March 16, 2001 || Socorro || LINEAR || EOS || align=right | 6.2 km || 
|-id=793 bgcolor=#d6d6d6
| 72793 ||  || — || March 16, 2001 || Socorro || LINEAR || — || align=right | 4.5 km || 
|-id=794 bgcolor=#d6d6d6
| 72794 ||  || — || March 19, 2001 || Socorro || LINEAR || EOS || align=right | 4.5 km || 
|-id=795 bgcolor=#d6d6d6
| 72795 ||  || — || March 20, 2001 || Anderson Mesa || LONEOS || ALA || align=right | 7.2 km || 
|-id=796 bgcolor=#E9E9E9
| 72796 ||  || — || March 20, 2001 || Anderson Mesa || LONEOS || — || align=right | 2.3 km || 
|-id=797 bgcolor=#d6d6d6
| 72797 ||  || — || March 20, 2001 || Anderson Mesa || LONEOS || — || align=right | 6.0 km || 
|-id=798 bgcolor=#E9E9E9
| 72798 ||  || — || March 17, 2001 || Kitt Peak || Spacewatch || HOF || align=right | 5.6 km || 
|-id=799 bgcolor=#fefefe
| 72799 ||  || — || March 16, 2001 || Socorro || LINEAR || — || align=right | 4.3 km || 
|-id=800 bgcolor=#d6d6d6
| 72800 ||  || — || March 16, 2001 || Socorro || LINEAR || — || align=right | 4.9 km || 
|}

72801–72900 

|-bgcolor=#d6d6d6
| 72801 Manzanera ||  ||  || March 25, 2001 || Kitt Peak || M. W. Buie || — || align=right | 7.4 km || 
|-id=802 bgcolor=#d6d6d6
| 72802 Wetton ||  ||  || March 26, 2001 || Kitt Peak || M. W. Buie || 628 || align=right | 4.1 km || 
|-id=803 bgcolor=#d6d6d6
| 72803 || 2001 GD || — || April 1, 2001 || Anderson Mesa || LONEOS || — || align=right | 11 km || 
|-id=804 bgcolor=#d6d6d6
| 72804 Caldentey || 2001 GQ ||  || April 11, 2001 || Majorca || S. Sánchez || — || align=right | 4.1 km || 
|-id=805 bgcolor=#E9E9E9
| 72805 ||  || — || April 14, 2001 || Socorro || LINEAR || EUN || align=right | 3.2 km || 
|-id=806 bgcolor=#E9E9E9
| 72806 ||  || — || April 15, 2001 || Socorro || LINEAR || MAR || align=right | 3.5 km || 
|-id=807 bgcolor=#d6d6d6
| 72807 ||  || — || April 15, 2001 || Socorro || LINEAR || — || align=right | 6.2 km || 
|-id=808 bgcolor=#d6d6d6
| 72808 ||  || — || April 13, 2001 || Kitt Peak || Spacewatch || TEL || align=right | 3.0 km || 
|-id=809 bgcolor=#E9E9E9
| 72809 ||  || — || April 13, 2001 || Haleakala || NEAT || — || align=right | 8.4 km || 
|-id=810 bgcolor=#d6d6d6
| 72810 ||  || — || April 15, 2001 || Socorro || LINEAR || EOS || align=right | 4.0 km || 
|-id=811 bgcolor=#d6d6d6
| 72811 ||  || — || April 15, 2001 || Socorro || LINEAR || EOS || align=right | 6.0 km || 
|-id=812 bgcolor=#d6d6d6
| 72812 ||  || — || April 15, 2001 || Socorro || LINEAR || — || align=right | 5.2 km || 
|-id=813 bgcolor=#d6d6d6
| 72813 ||  || — || April 15, 2001 || Socorro || LINEAR || TIR || align=right | 9.1 km || 
|-id=814 bgcolor=#E9E9E9
| 72814 ||  || — || April 15, 2001 || Kitt Peak || Spacewatch || HOF || align=right | 5.5 km || 
|-id=815 bgcolor=#E9E9E9
| 72815 ||  || — || April 15, 2001 || Socorro || LINEAR || ADE || align=right | 3.9 km || 
|-id=816 bgcolor=#d6d6d6
| 72816 ||  || — || April 15, 2001 || Kitt Peak || Spacewatch || — || align=right | 10 km || 
|-id=817 bgcolor=#E9E9E9
| 72817 ||  || — || April 15, 2001 || Socorro || LINEAR || — || align=right | 3.1 km || 
|-id=818 bgcolor=#E9E9E9
| 72818 || 2001 HM || — || April 16, 2001 || Reedy Creek || J. Broughton || EUN || align=right | 5.4 km || 
|-id=819 bgcolor=#d6d6d6
| 72819 Brunet || 2001 HX ||  || April 18, 2001 || Saint-Véran || Saint-Véran Obs. || VER || align=right | 7.5 km || 
|-id=820 bgcolor=#d6d6d6
| 72820 ||  || — || April 17, 2001 || Socorro || LINEAR || — || align=right | 5.5 km || 
|-id=821 bgcolor=#E9E9E9
| 72821 ||  || — || April 17, 2001 || Socorro || LINEAR || — || align=right | 4.7 km || 
|-id=822 bgcolor=#d6d6d6
| 72822 ||  || — || April 17, 2001 || Socorro || LINEAR || EMA || align=right | 9.7 km || 
|-id=823 bgcolor=#E9E9E9
| 72823 ||  || — || April 17, 2001 || Socorro || LINEAR || slow? || align=right | 4.2 km || 
|-id=824 bgcolor=#d6d6d6
| 72824 ||  || — || April 19, 2001 || Reedy Creek || J. Broughton || — || align=right | 6.6 km || 
|-id=825 bgcolor=#d6d6d6
| 72825 ||  || — || April 18, 2001 || Socorro || LINEAR || — || align=right | 13 km || 
|-id=826 bgcolor=#d6d6d6
| 72826 ||  || — || April 18, 2001 || Kitt Peak || Spacewatch || ALA || align=right | 7.2 km || 
|-id=827 bgcolor=#E9E9E9
| 72827 Maxaub ||  ||  || April 23, 2001 || Pla D'Arguines || R. Ferrando || — || align=right | 3.7 km || 
|-id=828 bgcolor=#d6d6d6
| 72828 ||  || — || April 16, 2001 || Socorro || LINEAR || ALA || align=right | 9.2 km || 
|-id=829 bgcolor=#E9E9E9
| 72829 ||  || — || April 18, 2001 || Socorro || LINEAR || INO || align=right | 3.2 km || 
|-id=830 bgcolor=#d6d6d6
| 72830 ||  || — || April 18, 2001 || Socorro || LINEAR || HYG || align=right | 8.5 km || 
|-id=831 bgcolor=#d6d6d6
| 72831 ||  || — || April 23, 2001 || Prescott || P. G. Comba || — || align=right | 8.2 km || 
|-id=832 bgcolor=#E9E9E9
| 72832 ||  || — || April 23, 2001 || Kitt Peak || Spacewatch || HOF || align=right | 5.4 km || 
|-id=833 bgcolor=#E9E9E9
| 72833 ||  || — || April 21, 2001 || Haleakala || NEAT || — || align=right | 7.6 km || 
|-id=834 bgcolor=#E9E9E9
| 72834 Guywells ||  ||  || April 25, 2001 || Emerald Lane || L. Ball || EUN || align=right | 2.8 km || 
|-id=835 bgcolor=#d6d6d6
| 72835 ||  || — || April 24, 2001 || Kitt Peak || Spacewatch || — || align=right | 4.9 km || 
|-id=836 bgcolor=#d6d6d6
| 72836 ||  || — || April 23, 2001 || Socorro || LINEAR || — || align=right | 9.6 km || 
|-id=837 bgcolor=#d6d6d6
| 72837 ||  || — || April 24, 2001 || Farpoint || Farpoint Obs. || SAN || align=right | 3.6 km || 
|-id=838 bgcolor=#d6d6d6
| 72838 ||  || — || April 27, 2001 || Socorro || LINEAR || — || align=right | 8.7 km || 
|-id=839 bgcolor=#E9E9E9
| 72839 ||  || — || April 26, 2001 || Desert Beaver || W. K. Y. Yeung || — || align=right | 6.6 km || 
|-id=840 bgcolor=#d6d6d6
| 72840 ||  || — || April 28, 2001 || Desert Beaver || W. K. Y. Yeung || URS || align=right | 10 km || 
|-id=841 bgcolor=#d6d6d6
| 72841 ||  || — || April 27, 2001 || San Marcello || A. Boattini, M. Tombelli || — || align=right | 5.3 km || 
|-id=842 bgcolor=#d6d6d6
| 72842 ||  || — || April 27, 2001 || Socorro || LINEAR || HYG || align=right | 8.4 km || 
|-id=843 bgcolor=#d6d6d6
| 72843 ||  || — || April 27, 2001 || Socorro || LINEAR || — || align=right | 4.3 km || 
|-id=844 bgcolor=#d6d6d6
| 72844 ||  || — || April 27, 2001 || Socorro || LINEAR || VER || align=right | 5.9 km || 
|-id=845 bgcolor=#d6d6d6
| 72845 ||  || — || April 27, 2001 || Socorro || LINEAR || — || align=right | 8.5 km || 
|-id=846 bgcolor=#d6d6d6
| 72846 ||  || — || April 29, 2001 || Socorro || LINEAR || — || align=right | 6.4 km || 
|-id=847 bgcolor=#d6d6d6
| 72847 ||  || — || April 29, 2001 || Socorro || LINEAR || — || align=right | 9.0 km || 
|-id=848 bgcolor=#d6d6d6
| 72848 ||  || — || April 29, 2001 || Socorro || LINEAR || URS || align=right | 4.4 km || 
|-id=849 bgcolor=#d6d6d6
| 72849 ||  || — || April 27, 2001 || Socorro || LINEAR || — || align=right | 9.2 km || 
|-id=850 bgcolor=#E9E9E9
| 72850 ||  || — || April 27, 2001 || Socorro || LINEAR || HNS || align=right | 4.3 km || 
|-id=851 bgcolor=#E9E9E9
| 72851 ||  || — || April 16, 2001 || Socorro || LINEAR || MAR || align=right | 3.1 km || 
|-id=852 bgcolor=#d6d6d6
| 72852 ||  || — || April 16, 2001 || Socorro || LINEAR || — || align=right | 12 km || 
|-id=853 bgcolor=#d6d6d6
| 72853 ||  || — || April 16, 2001 || Socorro || LINEAR || EOS || align=right | 6.0 km || 
|-id=854 bgcolor=#d6d6d6
| 72854 ||  || — || April 16, 2001 || Kitt Peak || Spacewatch || EOS || align=right | 4.1 km || 
|-id=855 bgcolor=#E9E9E9
| 72855 ||  || — || April 16, 2001 || Anderson Mesa || LONEOS || — || align=right | 3.4 km || 
|-id=856 bgcolor=#d6d6d6
| 72856 ||  || — || April 16, 2001 || Anderson Mesa || LONEOS || VER || align=right | 7.4 km || 
|-id=857 bgcolor=#d6d6d6
| 72857 ||  || — || April 18, 2001 || Kitt Peak || Spacewatch || — || align=right | 6.8 km || 
|-id=858 bgcolor=#d6d6d6
| 72858 ||  || — || April 18, 2001 || Socorro || LINEAR || THM || align=right | 5.6 km || 
|-id=859 bgcolor=#d6d6d6
| 72859 ||  || — || April 18, 2001 || Socorro || LINEAR || EOS || align=right | 5.4 km || 
|-id=860 bgcolor=#E9E9E9
| 72860 ||  || — || April 21, 2001 || Haleakala || NEAT || — || align=right | 3.1 km || 
|-id=861 bgcolor=#d6d6d6
| 72861 ||  || — || April 21, 2001 || Socorro || LINEAR || — || align=right | 5.4 km || 
|-id=862 bgcolor=#E9E9E9
| 72862 ||  || — || April 21, 2001 || Haleakala || NEAT || MAR || align=right | 3.5 km || 
|-id=863 bgcolor=#fefefe
| 72863 ||  || — || April 23, 2001 || Socorro || LINEAR || NYS || align=right | 1.4 km || 
|-id=864 bgcolor=#E9E9E9
| 72864 ||  || — || April 24, 2001 || Anderson Mesa || LONEOS || — || align=right | 9.0 km || 
|-id=865 bgcolor=#d6d6d6
| 72865 ||  || — || April 25, 2001 || Anderson Mesa || LONEOS || — || align=right | 8.8 km || 
|-id=866 bgcolor=#d6d6d6
| 72866 ||  || — || April 25, 2001 || Haleakala || NEAT || EOS || align=right | 5.4 km || 
|-id=867 bgcolor=#d6d6d6
| 72867 ||  || — || April 25, 2001 || Haleakala || NEAT || — || align=right | 3.9 km || 
|-id=868 bgcolor=#d6d6d6
| 72868 ||  || — || April 21, 2001 || Socorro || LINEAR || — || align=right | 5.0 km || 
|-id=869 bgcolor=#d6d6d6
| 72869 ||  || — || April 26, 2001 || Anderson Mesa || LONEOS || — || align=right | 8.4 km || 
|-id=870 bgcolor=#d6d6d6
| 72870 ||  || — || April 30, 2001 || Socorro || LINEAR || ALA || align=right | 8.3 km || 
|-id=871 bgcolor=#E9E9E9
| 72871 ||  || — || May 15, 2001 || Haleakala || NEAT || DOR || align=right | 4.3 km || 
|-id=872 bgcolor=#d6d6d6
| 72872 ||  || — || May 15, 2001 || Haleakala || NEAT || — || align=right | 5.6 km || 
|-id=873 bgcolor=#d6d6d6
| 72873 ||  || — || May 15, 2001 || Kitt Peak || Spacewatch || TRE || align=right | 3.2 km || 
|-id=874 bgcolor=#E9E9E9
| 72874 ||  || — || May 14, 2001 || Kitt Peak || Spacewatch || — || align=right | 7.2 km || 
|-id=875 bgcolor=#d6d6d6
| 72875 ||  || — || May 15, 2001 || Anderson Mesa || LONEOS || — || align=right | 7.1 km || 
|-id=876 bgcolor=#E9E9E9
| 72876 Vauriot ||  ||  || May 20, 2001 || Pises || Pises Obs. || — || align=right | 3.8 km || 
|-id=877 bgcolor=#d6d6d6
| 72877 ||  || — || May 21, 2001 || Goodricke-Pigott || R. A. Tucker || — || align=right | 6.3 km || 
|-id=878 bgcolor=#d6d6d6
| 72878 ||  || — || May 17, 2001 || Socorro || LINEAR || — || align=right | 6.2 km || 
|-id=879 bgcolor=#d6d6d6
| 72879 ||  || — || May 17, 2001 || Socorro || LINEAR || URS || align=right | 9.4 km || 
|-id=880 bgcolor=#d6d6d6
| 72880 ||  || — || May 18, 2001 || Socorro || LINEAR || — || align=right | 7.5 km || 
|-id=881 bgcolor=#d6d6d6
| 72881 ||  || — || May 18, 2001 || Socorro || LINEAR || EOS || align=right | 5.7 km || 
|-id=882 bgcolor=#d6d6d6
| 72882 ||  || — || May 18, 2001 || Socorro || LINEAR || URS || align=right | 15 km || 
|-id=883 bgcolor=#d6d6d6
| 72883 ||  || — || May 18, 2001 || Socorro || LINEAR || — || align=right | 11 km || 
|-id=884 bgcolor=#d6d6d6
| 72884 ||  || — || May 18, 2001 || Socorro || LINEAR || HYG || align=right | 6.6 km || 
|-id=885 bgcolor=#d6d6d6
| 72885 ||  || — || May 18, 2001 || Socorro || LINEAR || — || align=right | 4.8 km || 
|-id=886 bgcolor=#d6d6d6
| 72886 ||  || — || May 21, 2001 || Ondřejov || P. Kušnirák, P. Pravec || EOS || align=right | 4.2 km || 
|-id=887 bgcolor=#d6d6d6
| 72887 ||  || — || May 18, 2001 || Socorro || LINEAR || — || align=right | 10 km || 
|-id=888 bgcolor=#d6d6d6
| 72888 ||  || — || May 17, 2001 || Socorro || LINEAR || — || align=right | 9.3 km || 
|-id=889 bgcolor=#d6d6d6
| 72889 ||  || — || May 17, 2001 || Socorro || LINEAR || HYG || align=right | 6.0 km || 
|-id=890 bgcolor=#d6d6d6
| 72890 ||  || — || May 21, 2001 || Socorro || LINEAR || — || align=right | 8.3 km || 
|-id=891 bgcolor=#d6d6d6
| 72891 ||  || — || May 22, 2001 || Socorro || LINEAR || — || align=right | 6.4 km || 
|-id=892 bgcolor=#E9E9E9
| 72892 ||  || — || May 22, 2001 || Socorro || LINEAR || EUN || align=right | 4.9 km || 
|-id=893 bgcolor=#d6d6d6
| 72893 ||  || — || May 22, 2001 || Socorro || LINEAR || — || align=right | 8.2 km || 
|-id=894 bgcolor=#d6d6d6
| 72894 ||  || — || May 22, 2001 || Socorro || LINEAR || TIR || align=right | 6.0 km || 
|-id=895 bgcolor=#E9E9E9
| 72895 ||  || — || May 16, 2001 || Haleakala || NEAT || — || align=right | 2.6 km || 
|-id=896 bgcolor=#d6d6d6
| 72896 ||  || — || May 21, 2001 || Socorro || LINEAR || — || align=right | 6.1 km || 
|-id=897 bgcolor=#d6d6d6
| 72897 ||  || — || May 22, 2001 || Socorro || LINEAR || URS || align=right | 11 km || 
|-id=898 bgcolor=#d6d6d6
| 72898 ||  || — || May 23, 2001 || Socorro || LINEAR || — || align=right | 10 km || 
|-id=899 bgcolor=#d6d6d6
| 72899 ||  || — || May 17, 2001 || Kitt Peak || Spacewatch || EOS || align=right | 4.7 km || 
|-id=900 bgcolor=#d6d6d6
| 72900 ||  || — || May 17, 2001 || Kitt Peak || Spacewatch || EOS || align=right | 5.0 km || 
|}

72901–73000 

|-bgcolor=#E9E9E9
| 72901 ||  || — || May 22, 2001 || Anderson Mesa || LONEOS || GAL || align=right | 2.8 km || 
|-id=902 bgcolor=#d6d6d6
| 72902 ||  || — || May 24, 2001 || Anderson Mesa || LONEOS || — || align=right | 5.0 km || 
|-id=903 bgcolor=#d6d6d6
| 72903 ||  || — || May 24, 2001 || Anderson Mesa || LONEOS || — || align=right | 7.1 km || 
|-id=904 bgcolor=#d6d6d6
| 72904 ||  || — || May 26, 2001 || Socorro || LINEAR || — || align=right | 7.9 km || 
|-id=905 bgcolor=#fefefe
| 72905 || 2001 LX || — || June 13, 2001 || Socorro || LINEAR || — || align=right | 2.0 km || 
|-id=906 bgcolor=#d6d6d6
| 72906 ||  || — || June 13, 2001 || Desert Beaver || W. K. Y. Yeung || EOS || align=right | 5.0 km || 
|-id=907 bgcolor=#E9E9E9
| 72907 ||  || — || June 16, 2001 || Palomar || NEAT || EUN || align=right | 3.7 km || 
|-id=908 bgcolor=#d6d6d6
| 72908 ||  || — || June 21, 2001 || Palomar || NEAT || — || align=right | 6.9 km || 
|-id=909 bgcolor=#fefefe
| 72909 || 2001 NH || — || July 10, 2001 || Palomar || NEAT || V || align=right | 1.7 km || 
|-id=910 bgcolor=#fefefe
| 72910 ||  || — || July 14, 2001 || Palomar || NEAT || — || align=right | 2.3 km || 
|-id=911 bgcolor=#d6d6d6
| 72911 ||  || — || July 23, 2001 || Reedy Creek || J. Broughton || URS || align=right | 16 km || 
|-id=912 bgcolor=#E9E9E9
| 72912 ||  || — || July 18, 2001 || Mauna Kea || D. J. Tholen || — || align=right | 4.3 km || 
|-id=913 bgcolor=#d6d6d6
| 72913 ||  || — || July 29, 2001 || Palomar || NEAT || — || align=right | 8.9 km || 
|-id=914 bgcolor=#fefefe
| 72914 ||  || — || August 14, 2001 || Ondřejov || P. Kušnirák || NYS || align=right | 1.2 km || 
|-id=915 bgcolor=#d6d6d6
| 72915 ||  || — || August 11, 2001 || Haleakala || NEAT || — || align=right | 13 km || 
|-id=916 bgcolor=#fefefe
| 72916 ||  || — || August 16, 2001 || Socorro || LINEAR || FLO || align=right | 2.2 km || 
|-id=917 bgcolor=#fefefe
| 72917 ||  || — || August 21, 2001 || Kitt Peak || Spacewatch || FLO || align=right | 1.8 km || 
|-id=918 bgcolor=#fefefe
| 72918 ||  || — || September 12, 2001 || Socorro || LINEAR || NYS || align=right | 1.3 km || 
|-id=919 bgcolor=#E9E9E9
| 72919 ||  || — || September 16, 2001 || Socorro || LINEAR || AGN || align=right | 2.7 km || 
|-id=920 bgcolor=#d6d6d6
| 72920 ||  || — || September 20, 2001 || Socorro || LINEAR || TEL || align=right | 3.6 km || 
|-id=921 bgcolor=#fefefe
| 72921 ||  || — || October 16, 2001 || Socorro || LINEAR || V || align=right | 1.5 km || 
|-id=922 bgcolor=#E9E9E9
| 72922 ||  || — || October 23, 2001 || Socorro || LINEAR || EUN || align=right | 1.5 km || 
|-id=923 bgcolor=#fefefe
| 72923 ||  || — || November 9, 2001 || Socorro || LINEAR || NYS || align=right | 1.9 km || 
|-id=924 bgcolor=#E9E9E9
| 72924 ||  || — || November 20, 2001 || Socorro || LINEAR || — || align=right | 2.1 km || 
|-id=925 bgcolor=#E9E9E9
| 72925 ||  || — || December 10, 2001 || Socorro || LINEAR || HEN || align=right | 1.9 km || 
|-id=926 bgcolor=#E9E9E9
| 72926 ||  || — || December 14, 2001 || Socorro || LINEAR || — || align=right | 3.1 km || 
|-id=927 bgcolor=#fefefe
| 72927 ||  || — || December 14, 2001 || Socorro || LINEAR || — || align=right | 1.9 km || 
|-id=928 bgcolor=#d6d6d6
| 72928 ||  || — || January 8, 2002 || Oaxaca || J. M. Roe || — || align=right | 3.9 km || 
|-id=929 bgcolor=#fefefe
| 72929 ||  || — || January 7, 2002 || Kitt Peak || Spacewatch || — || align=right | 1.7 km || 
|-id=930 bgcolor=#fefefe
| 72930 ||  || — || January 11, 2002 || Desert Eagle || W. K. Y. Yeung || NYS || align=right | 1.9 km || 
|-id=931 bgcolor=#fefefe
| 72931 ||  || — || January 12, 2002 || Desert Eagle || W. K. Y. Yeung || — || align=right | 2.4 km || 
|-id=932 bgcolor=#fefefe
| 72932 ||  || — || January 11, 2002 || Socorro || LINEAR || — || align=right | 2.3 km || 
|-id=933 bgcolor=#fefefe
| 72933 ||  || — || January 12, 2002 || Socorro || LINEAR || H || align=right | 1.4 km || 
|-id=934 bgcolor=#d6d6d6
| 72934 ||  || — || January 9, 2002 || Socorro || LINEAR || KOR || align=right | 2.5 km || 
|-id=935 bgcolor=#fefefe
| 72935 ||  || — || January 14, 2002 || Socorro || LINEAR || NYS || align=right | 2.9 km || 
|-id=936 bgcolor=#fefefe
| 72936 ||  || — || January 13, 2002 || Socorro || LINEAR || NYS || align=right | 1.5 km || 
|-id=937 bgcolor=#fefefe
| 72937 ||  || — || January 14, 2002 || Socorro || LINEAR || — || align=right | 1.8 km || 
|-id=938 bgcolor=#fefefe
| 72938 ||  || — || January 25, 2002 || Socorro || LINEAR || H || align=right | 1.5 km || 
|-id=939 bgcolor=#E9E9E9
| 72939 ||  || — || January 23, 2002 || Socorro || LINEAR || — || align=right | 6.3 km || 
|-id=940 bgcolor=#fefefe
| 72940 ||  || — || January 21, 2002 || Palomar || NEAT || — || align=right | 1.8 km || 
|-id=941 bgcolor=#fefefe
| 72941 ||  || — || February 4, 2002 || Palomar || NEAT || ERI || align=right | 4.1 km || 
|-id=942 bgcolor=#fefefe
| 72942 ||  || — || February 6, 2002 || Socorro || LINEAR || H || align=right | 1.1 km || 
|-id=943 bgcolor=#fefefe
| 72943 ||  || — || February 6, 2002 || Socorro || LINEAR || H || align=right | 1.4 km || 
|-id=944 bgcolor=#fefefe
| 72944 ||  || — || February 8, 2002 || Desert Eagle || W. K. Y. Yeung || — || align=right | 1.5 km || 
|-id=945 bgcolor=#fefefe
| 72945 ||  || — || February 7, 2002 || Kingsnake || J. V. McClusky || H || align=right | 1.1 km || 
|-id=946 bgcolor=#fefefe
| 72946 ||  || — || February 6, 2002 || Socorro || LINEAR || — || align=right | 2.0 km || 
|-id=947 bgcolor=#fefefe
| 72947 ||  || — || February 4, 2002 || Palomar || NEAT || — || align=right | 1.8 km || 
|-id=948 bgcolor=#E9E9E9
| 72948 ||  || — || February 7, 2002 || Socorro || LINEAR || — || align=right | 3.0 km || 
|-id=949 bgcolor=#fefefe
| 72949 ||  || — || February 12, 2002 || Fountain Hills || C. W. Juels, P. R. Holvorcem || — || align=right | 2.7 km || 
|-id=950 bgcolor=#fefefe
| 72950 ||  || — || February 10, 2002 || Socorro || LINEAR || — || align=right | 1.1 km || 
|-id=951 bgcolor=#fefefe
| 72951 ||  || — || February 12, 2002 || Desert Eagle || W. K. Y. Yeung || — || align=right | 1.5 km || 
|-id=952 bgcolor=#fefefe
| 72952 ||  || — || February 7, 2002 || Socorro || LINEAR || — || align=right | 1.8 km || 
|-id=953 bgcolor=#fefefe
| 72953 ||  || — || February 12, 2002 || Desert Eagle || W. K. Y. Yeung || — || align=right | 1.6 km || 
|-id=954 bgcolor=#fefefe
| 72954 ||  || — || February 7, 2002 || Socorro || LINEAR || NYS || align=right | 1.7 km || 
|-id=955 bgcolor=#E9E9E9
| 72955 ||  || — || February 7, 2002 || Socorro || LINEAR || — || align=right | 3.0 km || 
|-id=956 bgcolor=#fefefe
| 72956 ||  || — || February 7, 2002 || Socorro || LINEAR || — || align=right | 1.5 km || 
|-id=957 bgcolor=#fefefe
| 72957 ||  || — || February 7, 2002 || Socorro || LINEAR || — || align=right | 2.1 km || 
|-id=958 bgcolor=#fefefe
| 72958 ||  || — || February 7, 2002 || Socorro || LINEAR || NYS || align=right | 1.5 km || 
|-id=959 bgcolor=#fefefe
| 72959 ||  || — || February 7, 2002 || Socorro || LINEAR || NYS || align=right | 1.3 km || 
|-id=960 bgcolor=#fefefe
| 72960 ||  || — || February 7, 2002 || Socorro || LINEAR || — || align=right | 1.6 km || 
|-id=961 bgcolor=#fefefe
| 72961 ||  || — || February 7, 2002 || Socorro || LINEAR || NYS || align=right | 1.8 km || 
|-id=962 bgcolor=#fefefe
| 72962 ||  || — || February 7, 2002 || Socorro || LINEAR || — || align=right | 3.8 km || 
|-id=963 bgcolor=#fefefe
| 72963 ||  || — || February 8, 2002 || Socorro || LINEAR || NYS || align=right | 1.6 km || 
|-id=964 bgcolor=#fefefe
| 72964 ||  || — || February 9, 2002 || Anderson Mesa || LONEOS || V || align=right | 1.6 km || 
|-id=965 bgcolor=#E9E9E9
| 72965 ||  || — || February 7, 2002 || Socorro || LINEAR || — || align=right | 4.4 km || 
|-id=966 bgcolor=#fefefe
| 72966 ||  || — || February 8, 2002 || Socorro || LINEAR || — || align=right | 3.6 km || 
|-id=967 bgcolor=#fefefe
| 72967 ||  || — || February 8, 2002 || Socorro || LINEAR || — || align=right | 2.6 km || 
|-id=968 bgcolor=#fefefe
| 72968 ||  || — || February 10, 2002 || Socorro || LINEAR || — || align=right | 2.2 km || 
|-id=969 bgcolor=#fefefe
| 72969 ||  || — || February 10, 2002 || Socorro || LINEAR || NYS || align=right | 1.7 km || 
|-id=970 bgcolor=#fefefe
| 72970 ||  || — || February 8, 2002 || Socorro || LINEAR || — || align=right | 2.2 km || 
|-id=971 bgcolor=#fefefe
| 72971 ||  || — || February 10, 2002 || Socorro || LINEAR || — || align=right | 1.4 km || 
|-id=972 bgcolor=#fefefe
| 72972 ||  || — || February 10, 2002 || Socorro || LINEAR || MAS || align=right | 1.7 km || 
|-id=973 bgcolor=#fefefe
| 72973 ||  || — || February 10, 2002 || Socorro || LINEAR || — || align=right | 1.4 km || 
|-id=974 bgcolor=#fefefe
| 72974 ||  || — || February 10, 2002 || Socorro || LINEAR || NYS || align=right | 4.5 km || 
|-id=975 bgcolor=#d6d6d6
| 72975 ||  || — || February 7, 2002 || Socorro || LINEAR || EUP || align=right | 10 km || 
|-id=976 bgcolor=#fefefe
| 72976 ||  || — || February 8, 2002 || Socorro || LINEAR || FLO || align=right | 1.5 km || 
|-id=977 bgcolor=#E9E9E9
| 72977 ||  || — || February 8, 2002 || Socorro || LINEAR || — || align=right | 3.9 km || 
|-id=978 bgcolor=#fefefe
| 72978 ||  || — || February 8, 2002 || Socorro || LINEAR || — || align=right | 2.4 km || 
|-id=979 bgcolor=#fefefe
| 72979 ||  || — || February 11, 2002 || Socorro || LINEAR || — || align=right | 1.7 km || 
|-id=980 bgcolor=#fefefe
| 72980 ||  || — || February 11, 2002 || Socorro || LINEAR || — || align=right | 1.7 km || 
|-id=981 bgcolor=#fefefe
| 72981 ||  || — || February 15, 2002 || Kitt Peak || Spacewatch || NYS || align=right | 1.3 km || 
|-id=982 bgcolor=#fefefe
| 72982 ||  || — || February 15, 2002 || Socorro || LINEAR || — || align=right | 2.4 km || 
|-id=983 bgcolor=#fefefe
| 72983 ||  || — || February 15, 2002 || Socorro || LINEAR || — || align=right | 2.0 km || 
|-id=984 bgcolor=#E9E9E9
| 72984 ||  || — || February 5, 2002 || Palomar || NEAT || — || align=right | 4.3 km || 
|-id=985 bgcolor=#fefefe
| 72985 ||  || — || February 19, 2002 || Desert Eagle || W. K. Y. Yeung || — || align=right | 1.4 km || 
|-id=986 bgcolor=#fefefe
| 72986 ||  || — || February 19, 2002 || Socorro || LINEAR || PHO || align=right | 2.3 km || 
|-id=987 bgcolor=#fefefe
| 72987 ||  || — || February 21, 2002 || Socorro || LINEAR || H || align=right | 1.4 km || 
|-id=988 bgcolor=#fefefe
| 72988 || 2002 EP || — || March 5, 2002 || Desert Eagle || W. K. Y. Yeung || — || align=right | 1.7 km || 
|-id=989 bgcolor=#fefefe
| 72989 ||  || — || March 6, 2002 || Socorro || LINEAR || — || align=right | 2.0 km || 
|-id=990 bgcolor=#fefefe
| 72990 ||  || — || March 12, 2002 || Desert Eagle || W. K. Y. Yeung || — || align=right | 1.6 km || 
|-id=991 bgcolor=#E9E9E9
| 72991 ||  || — || March 10, 2002 || Haleakala || NEAT || BRU || align=right | 4.7 km || 
|-id=992 bgcolor=#fefefe
| 72992 ||  || — || March 15, 2002 || Kvistaberg || UDAS || V || align=right | 1.8 km || 
|-id=993 bgcolor=#fefefe
| 72993 Hannahlivsey ||  ||  || March 15, 2002 || Nogales || Tenagra II Obs. || NYS || align=right | 1.6 km || 
|-id=994 bgcolor=#fefefe
| 72994 ||  || — || March 12, 2002 || Socorro || LINEAR || — || align=right | 1.3 km || 
|-id=995 bgcolor=#fefefe
| 72995 ||  || — || March 14, 2002 || Desert Eagle || W. K. Y. Yeung || NYS || align=right | 2.4 km || 
|-id=996 bgcolor=#fefefe
| 72996 ||  || — || March 14, 2002 || Desert Eagle || W. K. Y. Yeung || — || align=right | 2.4 km || 
|-id=997 bgcolor=#fefefe
| 72997 ||  || — || March 5, 2002 || Palomar || NEAT || V || align=right | 1.3 km || 
|-id=998 bgcolor=#E9E9E9
| 72998 ||  || — || March 6, 2002 || Palomar || NEAT || — || align=right | 3.8 km || 
|-id=999 bgcolor=#fefefe
| 72999 ||  || — || March 9, 2002 || Socorro || LINEAR || V || align=right | 1.5 km || 
|-id=000 bgcolor=#E9E9E9
| 73000 ||  || — || March 9, 2002 || Socorro || LINEAR || — || align=right | 3.4 km || 
|}

References

External links 
 Discovery Circumstances: Numbered Minor Planets (70001)–(75000) (IAU Minor Planet Center)

0072